= VAXserver =

Family of minicomputers

The VAXserver was a family of minicomputers developed and manufactured by Digital Equipment Corporation (DEC) using processors implementing the VAX instruction set architecture (ISA). The VAXserver models were variants of various VAX-based computers which were configured to only run operating systems which were licensed for network server use and not interactive time-sharing use. This was accomplished with different CPU modules and firmware.

VAXserver models include:

- VAXserver 3000 – (Based on the MicroVAX)
  - VAXserver 3100
  - VAXserver 3300
  - VAXserver 3400
  - VAXserver 3500
  - VAXserver 3600
  - VAXserver 3602
  - VAXserver 3800
  - VAXserver 3900
- VAXserver 4000 – (Based on the VAX 4000)
  - VAXserver 4000 Model 200 – KA660-BA CPU module
  - VAXserver 4000 Model 300 – KA670-BA CPU module
- VAXserver 6000 – (Based on the VAX 6000)
  - VAXserver 6000 Model 210
  - VAXserver 6000 Model 220
  - VAXserver 6000 Model 310
  - VAXserver 6000 Model 320
  - VAXserver 6000 Model 410
  - VAXserver 6000 Model 420
  - VAXserver 6000 Model 510
  - VAXserver 6000 Model 520
- VAXserver 9000 – (Based on the VAX 9000)
  - VAXserver 9000 Model 110
  - VAXserver 9000 Model 3x0
    - VAXserver 9000 Model 310/Model 310VP
    - VAXserver 9000 Model 320/Model 320VP
    - VAXserver 9000 Model 330/Model 330VP
    - VAXserver 9000 Model 340/Model 340VP
