= Dick Hustvedt =

American computer scientist

Richard "Dick" Irvin Hustvedt (February 18, 1946 – April 15, 2008) was a renowned software engineer, designer and developer of several operating systems including Digital Equipment Corporation's RSX-11, and VMS.

== Personal history ==
Hustvedt was born in Aberdeen, South Dakota and grew up in Radcliff, Kentucky, home of Fort Knox. He attended the University of California, Berkeley studying computer science and was later employed by the Army Security Agency. Following the ASA, Dick worked for the Xerox Corporation on the development of operating systems for their Data Systems division (Xerox DSD Development Programming in El Segundo, California), and was a principal kernel developer of the Xerox Data Systems (XDS) RAD-75, RBM-1 and CP-V operating systems.

He was recruited by Ken Olsen to join Digital Equipment Corporation (DEC) in 1974. He moved from Los Angeles, California to Concord, Massachusetts where he worked at the company headquarters at "The Mill" in Maynard, Massachusetts.

Married to Audrey R. Reith (1936?-2024) in 1976. Father of sons Eric Hustvedt (1978) and Marc Hustvedt (1979).

On January 13, 1984, he suffered a severe head injury in an automobile accident in Acton, Massachusetts. He resided in New Hampshire at the time of his death on April 15, 2008.

The VAX/VMS development team, now OpenVMS and part of Hewlett-Packard, named a conference room in his honor in Nashua, New Hampshire facility.

== DEC ==
Dick Hustvedt was one of the three principal designers of VMS, along with Dave Cutler and Peter Lipman. VMS was first conceived in 1976 as the operating system for the 32-bit, virtual memory line of computers eventually named VAX. Version V1.0 shipped in 1978 and the VAX and VMS became flagship products for DEC. Hustvedt was also the driving force behind the development of DEC's VAXcluster, which was the first clustering system to achieve commercial success, and was a major selling point for VAX systems.

His sense of humor is behind the fact that the TIMEPROMPTWAIT variable in VMS is famously defined in "microfortnights".
