= VAXstation =

Family of DEC workstation computers

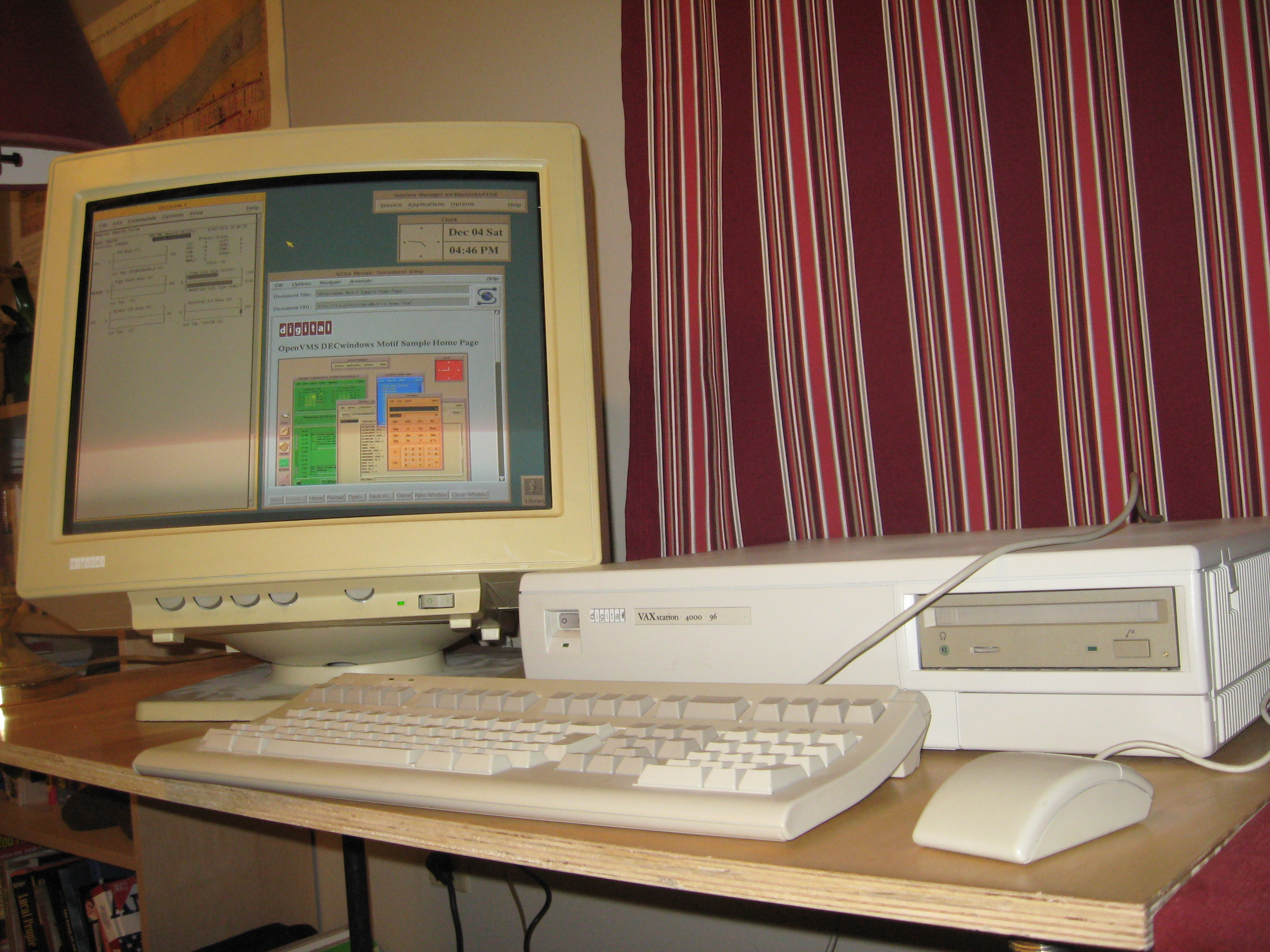
VAXstation 4000 model 96 running OpenVMS 6.1 and DECwindows

The VAXstation is a discontinued family of workstation computers developed and manufactured by Digital Equipment Corporation using processors implementing the VAX instruction set architecture. VAXstation systems were typically shipped with either the OpenVMS or ULTRIX operating systems. Many members of the VAXstation family had corresponding MicroVAX variants, which primarily differ by the lack of graphics hardware.

== VAXstation 100 ==
The VAXstation 100 is an intelligent graphics terminal (also described as a Display subsystem) introduced by Digital in May 1983 for the VAX-11 line of computers. The VAXstation 100 was Digital's first workstation hardware for the VAX platform; the graphics terminal approach was selected due to the lack of a VLSI VAX CPU necessary to create a standalone VAX workstation when the project began in 1981. The VAXstation 100's design was based on two internal research projects at Digital - a dedicated VAX workstation named SUVAX (Single User VAX), and a project to port Smalltalk-80 to a VAX-11/780 equipped with a bitmap display, the latter being noted as having a greater influence on the finished product. Digital's literature suggested various configurations for the VAXstation 100, such as attaching multiple VAXstation 100s to a large VAX-11/78x system, or attaching a single one to a smaller system such as a VAX-11/725 to create a single user workstation.

The VAXstation 100 consisted of a desk-side unit housing a Motorola 68000 processor, a dedicated bit blit accelerator built from AMD 2901 logic, and a total of 640KB of RAM (128KB for the CPU, and a 512KB frame buffer). Attached to this unit was a 19" monochrome monitor, an LK201 keyboard, a mouse, and optionally a graphics tablet and five-button puck. The VAXstation 100 interfaced with the host VAX system over a fibre optic cable with a maximum length of 300 meters to a Unibus card named the Unibus Window Module. Application logic ran on the host's VAX CPU, and the code for displaying graphics ran on the VAXstation 100's processor. The VAXstation 100's processor was capable of directly accessing a 256KB window of the host system's memory, which was used to share data and commands between the host and the workstation.

Digital's official software for the VAXstation was the VAX Display Subsystem Software (VDSS) which was installed under VAX/VMS and provided a basic GUI environment for the VAXstation 100 with terminal emulation software. Custom GUI applications could be developed using the VAXstation Display Management Library (known as VSTA) and the VAXstation Core Graphics Library. Third-party interfaces were developed for the VAXstation 100, most notably, the earliest versions of the X Window System.

== VAXstation 500 ==
The VAXstation 500 was a VAXstation system with color graphics, introduced in March 1985. It consisted of a MicroVAX I and a Tektronix 4125 colour terminal.

=== VAXstation 520 ===
The VAXstation 520 was a follow-on to the VAXstation 500 which used a MicroVAX II as the host system instead of a MicroVAX I. At the time of its introduction in September 1985, a configuration with 2MB of memory, a 32MB hard disk and two 400KB floppy disk drives cost $40,790.

== VAXstation I ==
Introduced in October 1984, it was code named "Seahorse", and used the KD32 CPU module containing a 4 MHz (250 ns) MicroVAX I processor.

== VAXstation II ==
Code named "Mayflower", it used the KA630 CPU module containing a 5 MHz (200 ns) MicroVAX 78032 microprocessor. It was essentially a MicroVAX II in a workstation configuration.

=== VAXstation II/RC ===
A short-lived, lower-cost "Reduced Configuration" variant of the VAXstation II. Compared with the standard VAXstation II, a number of the slots on the backplane were filled with epoxy to limit the system's upgradability. It was discontinued when Digital discovered that enterprising customers were removing the epoxy, or replacing the backplane in order to convert the RC into a standard VAXstation II.

=== VAXstation II/GPX ===
Introduced in December 1985, it was code named "Caylith", and was a variant of the VAXstation II with hardware-enhanced, high-performance color graphics.

== VAXstation 2000 ==
Introduced in February 1987, it was code named "VAXstar" or "Kapri", and used the KA410 CPU module containing a 5 MHz MicroVAX II processor with no cache. It was essentially a MicroVAX 2000 in a workstation configuration.

== VAXstation 3100 Series ==
=== VAXstation 3100 Model 30 (VS42A-xx) ===
Code named "PVAX", it used the KA42-A CPU module containing an 11.12 MHz (90 ns) CVAX microprocessor with a 64 KB external cache.

The VT1300 X terminal was essentially a diskless VAXstation 3100 Model 30, running the VAXELN operating system.

=== VAXstation 3100 Model 38 (WS42A-xx) ===
Code named "PVAX rev#7", it used the KA42-B CPU module containing a 16.67 MHz (60 ns) CVAX+ microprocessor with a 64KB external cache.

=== VAXstation 3100 Model 40 (VS42S-xx) ===
Code named "PVAX", it used the KA42-A CPU module containing an 11.12 MHz (90 ns) CVAX microprocessor with a 64KB external cache. It used the same CPU module and system board as the Model 30, but was housed in a larger case which could hold additional 5.25" and 3.5" drives.

=== VAXstation 3100 Model 48 (WS42B-xx) ===
Code named "PVAX rev#7", it used the KA42-B CPU module containing a 16.67 MHz (60 ns) CVAX+ microprocessor with a 64KB external cache.

=== VAXstation 3100 Model 76 ===
Code named "RigelMAX", it used the KA43-A CPU module containing a 35.71 MHz (28 ns) Rigel microprocessor with a 128 KB external cache. It provided two separate SCSI buses, one for internal devices and one for external.

=== VXT 2000 ===
The VXT 2000 was an X terminal using the SOC microprocessor. This system was essentially a VAXstation 3100 Model 30 without any mass storage and set up to network boot a VAXELN image that allowed it to be an X Window System terminal.

== VAXstation 3200 and VAXstation 3500 ==
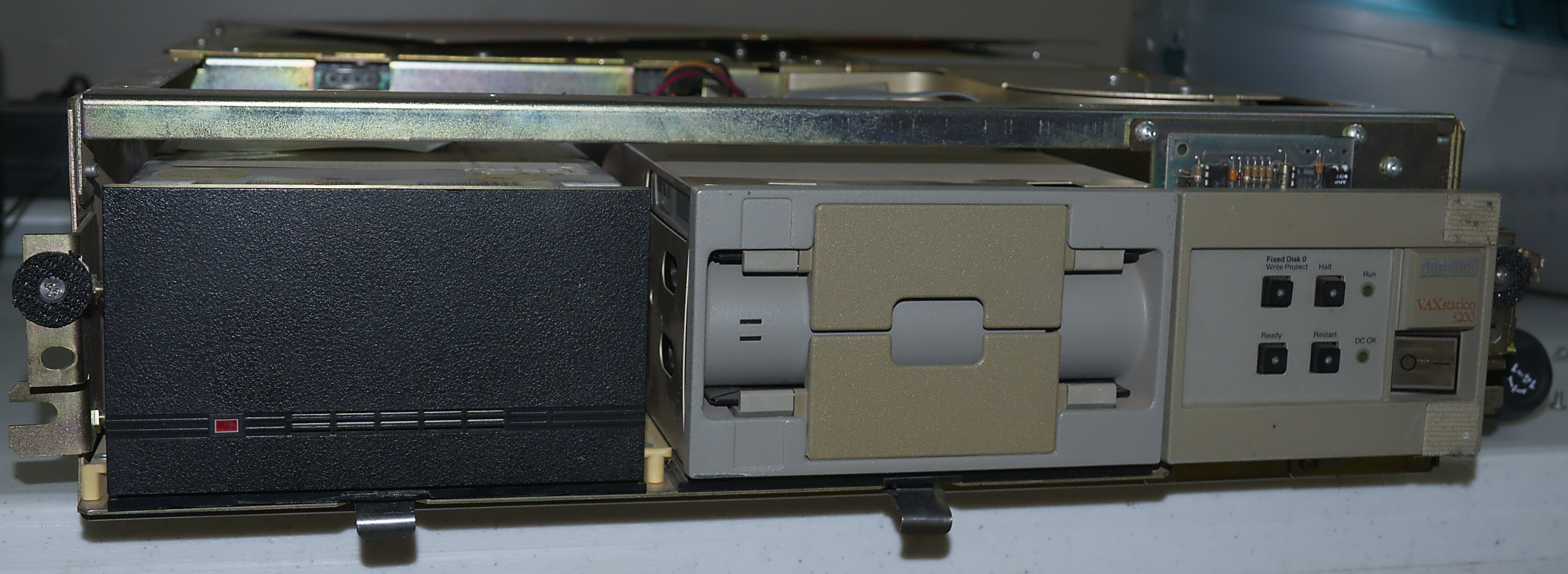
Rackmount variant of the VAXstation 3200.

Code named "Mayfair/GPX", it used the KA650 CPU module containing a CVAX chip set operating at 11.12 MHz (90 ns cycle time) with 64 KB of external secondary cache. They differed by the enclosure used, the 3200 using a BA23, whereas the 3500 used the BA213. As such, they were effectively workstation configurations of the MicroVAX III and MicroVAX 3500 respectively.

== VAXstation 3520 and VAXstation 3540 ==
The VAXstation 3520 and VAXstation 3540, code named "Firefox", were multiprocessor computers with two or four CVAX chip sets respectively, contained on KA60 CPU modules running at 12.5 MHz (80 ns cycle time). They were based on the experimental DEC Firefly multiprocessor workstation, and were positioned as mid-range workstations. The first official announcement from Digital regarding these workstations was on 10 January 1989, although it was a "programme announcement" with no dates or prices provided.

== VAXstation 4000 Series ==
=== VAXstation 4000 Model VLC ===
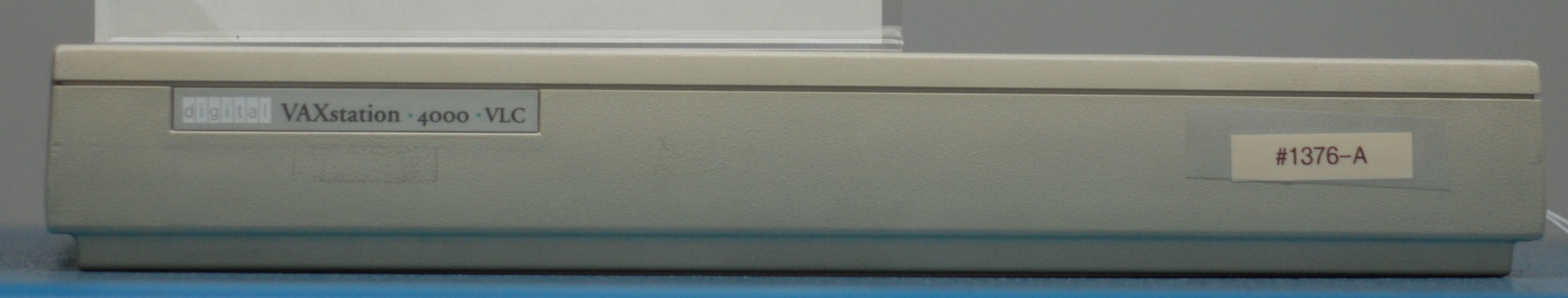
VAXstation 4000 VLC on display at the Living Computer Museum

The VAXstation 4000 VLC (Very Low Cost), aka VAXstation 4000 M30, was an entry-level workstation introduced on 30 October 1991. It was code named "PVAX2/VLC". It used the KA48 CPU module containing a 25 MHz (40 ns cycle time) SOC microprocessor. It had 8 to 24 MB of memory, using the MS40-BA SIMM, which was a low-height standard 72-pin 80 ns memory module with parity.

=== VAXstation 4000 Model 60 ===
The VAXstation 4000 Model 60, code named "PMariah", was announced on 30 October 1991 and became available on 25 November 1991. It used the KA46 CPU module containing a Mariah chip set operating at 55 MHz (18 ns cycle time) with 256 KB of external cache. It supported 8 to 104 MB of memory, with SIMMs installed in pairs. SIMMs used were the 4 MB MS44L-AA and the 16 MB MS44-DA, which both had parity. It was the first VAX system to use the TURBOchannel interconnect. The upgrade path was to the VAXstation 4000 Model 96.

=== VAXstation 4000 Model 90 ===
The VAXstation 4000 Model 90, code named "Cougar", was a further development of the VAXstation 4000 Model 60. Development of the VAXstation 4000 Model 90 began in mid-1991.

The workstation used the KA49-A CPU module containing a NVAX microprocessor operating at 74.43 MHz (14 ns cycle time) with a 256 KB external secondary cache. The NVAX had a 64-bit data bus to the NMC (NVAX Memory Controller) two gate array. The system module contained eight SIMM slots, and the workstation supported 16 to 128 MB of memory with parity. 16 MB MS44L-BC and 64 MB MS44-DC memory kits were used to populate the SIMM slots. Each memory kit contained four SIMMs with capacities of 4 MB and 16 MB respectively.

The VAXstation 4000 Model 90 supported 3D graphics hardware, the SPXg and SPXgt options. These modules had their own connector on the system module.

I/O was based around the NCA, a gate array which implemented an input/output adapter. The I/O subsystem had two independent 32-bit buses that communicated with the I/O and graphics options available. One of the buses interfaced to a TURBOchannel slot, the firmware contained within ROMs and the graphics options. The other bus interfaced to the Ethernet and EDAL controllers. EDAL was a 16-bit general-purpose bus for I/O. The EDAL controller consisted of a CEAC (CDAL-to-EDAL Chip) and a SQWF chip.

Ethernet was provided by the SGEC (Second-Generation Ethernet Controller) chip. SCSI was provided by the NCR 53C94, which connected to the EDAL bus. Serial lines were provided by a DC7085 quad UART. The four serial lines were used for the keyboard, mouse, modem and printer/console. A 64-entry FIFO queue was provided for all four serial lines and was implemented by a small external SRAM. Voice-quality sound was provided by an AMD Am79C30.

The VAXstation 4000 Model 90 could be upgraded to a VAXstation 4000 Model 96.

=== VAXstation 4000 Model 90A ===
The VAXstation 4000 Model 90A, code named "Cougar+", was a faster version of the Model 90. It used the KA49-A CPU module containing a NVAX microprocessor operating at 83 MHz (12 ns cycle time) but was otherwise the same. The upgrade path was to the VAXstation 4000 Model 96.

=== VAXstation 4000 Model 96 ===
The VAXstation 4000 Model 96, code named "Cougar++", was a faster version of the Model 90A. It was discontinued on 30 September 1999, with the last shipments concluding on 31 December 1999.

It used the KA49-C CPU module containing a NVAX microprocessor operating at 100 MHz (10 ns cycle time) but was otherwise the same.

== VAXstation 8000 ==
The VAXstation 8000, code named "Lynx", was a high-end workstation introduced on 2 February 1988. It was essentially a VAX 8250 packaged in a deskside enclosure with a 3D graphics pipeline developed jointly with Evans & Sutherland. It was the only VAXstation to use a processor which implemented the full VAX instruction set - all other models relied on software emulation for some of the less common VAX instructions.

== Software ==
DTP software for VMS on the VAXstation included Interleaf IWPS/IWPS-Plus, CGS Digi-Design/ORIS, DECwrite and WordPerfect.

Mechanical CAE software: Applicon Bravo (in 1988; with 3D-views), SDRC applications (incl. FEM pre- and postprocessing, I-DEAS), Prime GNC (GNC i.e. Graphical Numerical Control; a Numerical control application), MCS (Manufacturing & Consulting Services) ANVIL-5000, ISYKON (bought by Intergraph) Proren, EUCLID-IS, Unigraphics, and MEDUSA
