= VAX 4000 =

Family of low-end superminicomputers

The VAX 4000 is a discontinued family of low-end superminicomputers developed and manufactured by Digital Equipment Corporation (later Compaq) using microprocessors implementing the VAX instruction set architecture (ISA). The VAX 4000 succeeded the MicroVAX family, and shipped with the OpenVMS operating system. It was the last family of low-end VAX systems, as the platform was discontinued by Compaq.

== VAX 4000 Model 300 ==
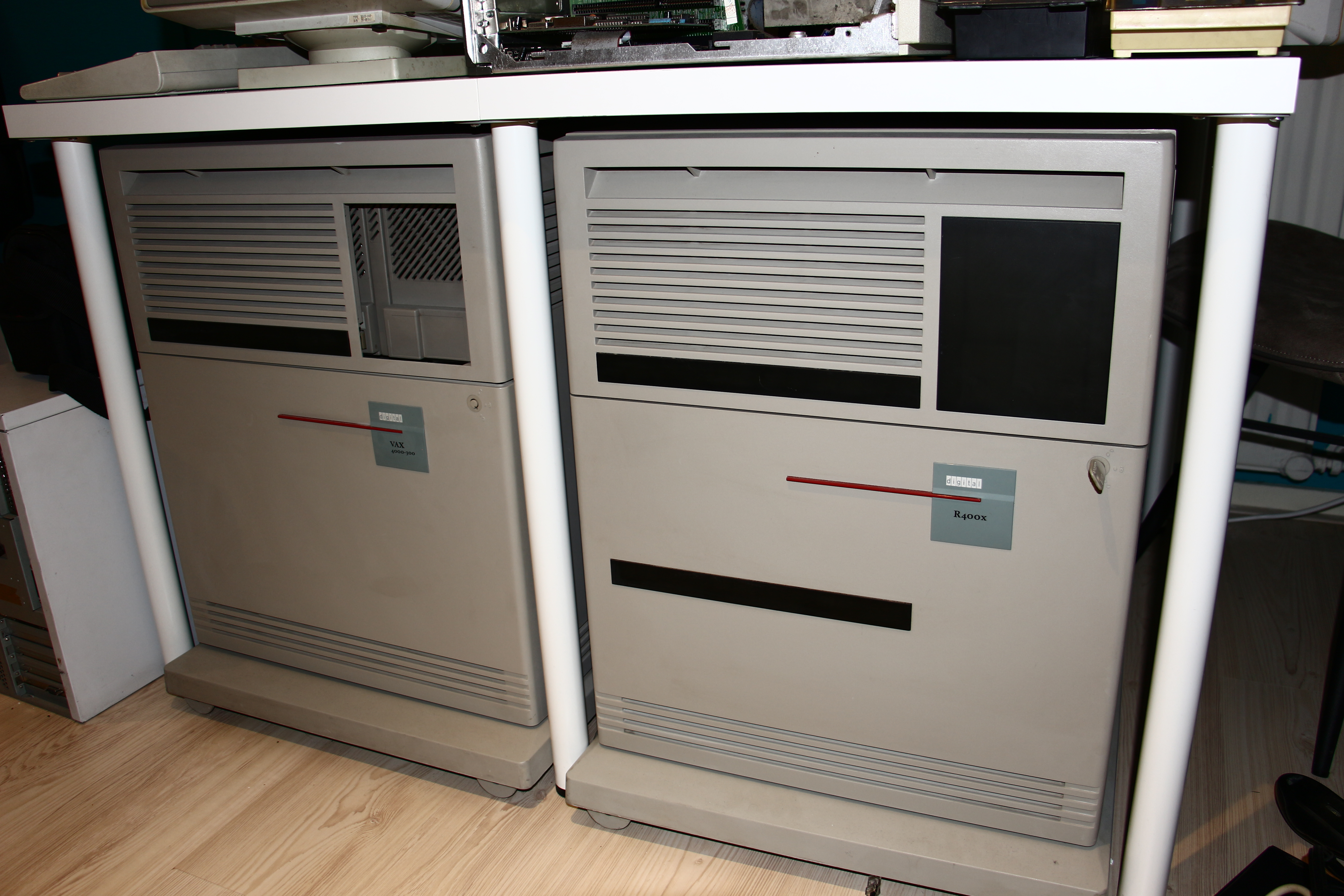
A VAX 4000-300 (on the left) and an R400X expansion chassis.

The VAX 4000 Model 300, code-named "Pele", was introduced on 9 July 1990 at DECworld in Boston, Massachusetts, replacing the MicroVAX 3800 and 3900. It used the time-sharing KA670-AA CPU module containing a 35.71 MHz (28 ns cycle time) Rigel chip set with a 128 KB external secondary cache protected by ECC built from 84 ns SRAM. It supported one to four MS670-BA (32 MB) or MS670-CA (64 MB) memory modules for 32 to 256 MB of memory. Q-bus was used for expansion. The Model 300 could be upgraded to a Model 400, Model 500 or Model 600 by replacing the backplane, CPU and memory module(s).

== VAX 4000 Model 200 ==
VAX 4000 Model 200, code-named "Spitfire", was introduced in January 1991 as replacement for the MicroVAX 3400. It was positioned beneath the VAX 4000 Model 300. It used the KA660 CPU module containing a 28.57 MHz (35 ns cycle time) SOC microprocessor. It supported 16 to 64 MB of memory.

== VAX 4000 Model 500 ==
The VAX 4000 Model 500, code-named "Omega/N", was introduced on 30 October 1991, with availability in December 1991. It succeeded the VAX 4000 Model 300, but the older system remained available as a lower cost alternative. It used the KA680 CPU module containing a 71.43 MHz (14 ns cycle time) NVAX microprocessor with 128 KB of external tertiary cache. The model 500 introduced the faster MS690 memory modules that supported 32MB, 64MB and 128MB options for a maximum system memory of 512MB.

== VAX 4000 Model 100 ==
The VAX 4000 Model 100, code-named "Cheetah-Q", is an entry-level VAX 4000 system introduced on 7 July 1992. It used the KA52 CPU module containing a 72 MHz (14 ns cycle time) NVAX microprocessor with 128 KB of external tertiary cache. It supported up to 128 MB of memory.

== VAX 4000 Model 400 ==
The VAX 4000 Model 400, code-named "Slow-mega", was a distributed server, positioned as a mid-range VAX 4000 system, introduced on 7 July 1992. It used the KA675 CPU module containing a 63 MHz (16 ns) NVAX microprocessor with microcode patch changes to slow it down beyond the cycle scaling, with 128 KB of external tertiary cache. It supported 16 to 512 MB of memory.

== VAX 4000 Model 600 ==
The VAX 4000 Model 600, code-named "Omega/N+", was a distributed server, positioned as a high-end VAX 4000 system, introduced on 7 July 1992. It used the KA690 CPU module containing an 83 MHz (12 ns) NVAX microprocessor with and 512 KB of external tertiary cache. It supported 16 to 512 MB of memory with the MS690 memory modules.

== VAX 4000 Model 100A ==
The VAX 4000 Model 100A, code-named "Cheetah-Q", was introduced on 12 October 1993. It used the KA52 CPU module containing a 72 MHz (14 ns cycle time) NVAX microprocessor with 128 KB of external tertiary cache. It supported up to 128 MB of memory.

== VAX 4000 Model 500A ==
The VAX 4000 Model 500A, code-named "Omega/N", was introduced on 12 October 1993. It used the KA681 CPU module containing a 71.43 MHz (14 ns cycle time) NVAX microprocessor with 128 KB of external tertiary cache.

== VAX 4000 Model 600A ==
The VAX 4000 Model 600A, code-named "Omega/N+", was introduced on 12 October 1993. It used the KA691 CPU module containing an 83 MHz (12 ns cycle time) NVAX microprocessor with 512 KB of external tertiary cache.

== VAX 4000 Model 700A ==
The VAX 4000 Model 700A, code-named "Legacy", was introduced on 12 October 1993. It used the KA692 CPU module containing a 100 MHz (10 ns cycle time) NVAX microprocessor with 2 MB of external tertiary cache.

== VAX 4000 Model 105A ==
The VAX 4000 Model 105, code named "Cheetah-Q+", was introduced on 12 April 1994. It used the KA53 CPU module containing an 83 MHz (12 ns cycle time) NVAX microprocessor with 128 KB of external tertiary cache. It supported up to 128 MB of memory.

== VAX 4000 Model 505A ==
The VAX 4000 Model 505A, code-named "Omega/N+", was introduced in late August 1994. It used an 83 MHz (12 ns) NVAX microprocessor with 512 KB of external tertiary cache.

== VAX 4000 Model 705A ==
The VAX 4000 Model 705A, code-named "Legacy+", was introduced in late August 1994. It used the KA694 CPU module containing a 111.12 MHz (9 ns cycle time) NVAX microprocessor with 2 MB of external tertiary cache.

== VAX 4000 Model 106A ==
The VAX 4000 Model 106A, code-named "Cheetah-Q++", used the KA54 CPU module containing a 100 MHz (10 ns cycle time) NVAX microprocessor with 512 KB of external tertiary cache. It was replaced by the VAX 4000 Model 108.

== VAX 4000 Model 108 ==
The VAX 4000 Model 108, code-named "Cheetah-Q++", was introduced on 8 October 1996 to replace the VAX 4000 Model 106A. It was discontinued on 30 September 2000, with the last systems shipped on 31 December 2000. It used the KA57 CPU module containing a 100 MHz (10 ns cycle time) NVAX microprocessor with 512 KB of external tertiary cache. It supported up to 256 Mb of memory with SIMMs using an industry standard form factor, double that of the previous model. The change from a proprietary SIMM to an industry standard SIMM was to lower costs, which also included reducing the size of the enclosure and more provisions for disks.

== VAX 4000 Model 50 ==
The VAX 4000 Model 50, code-named "VAXbrick", was an upgrade for MicroVAX 3x00 or VAX 4000 Model 200. It used the KA600 CPU module containing a NVAX microprocessor.
