= Dave Cutler =

American software engineer

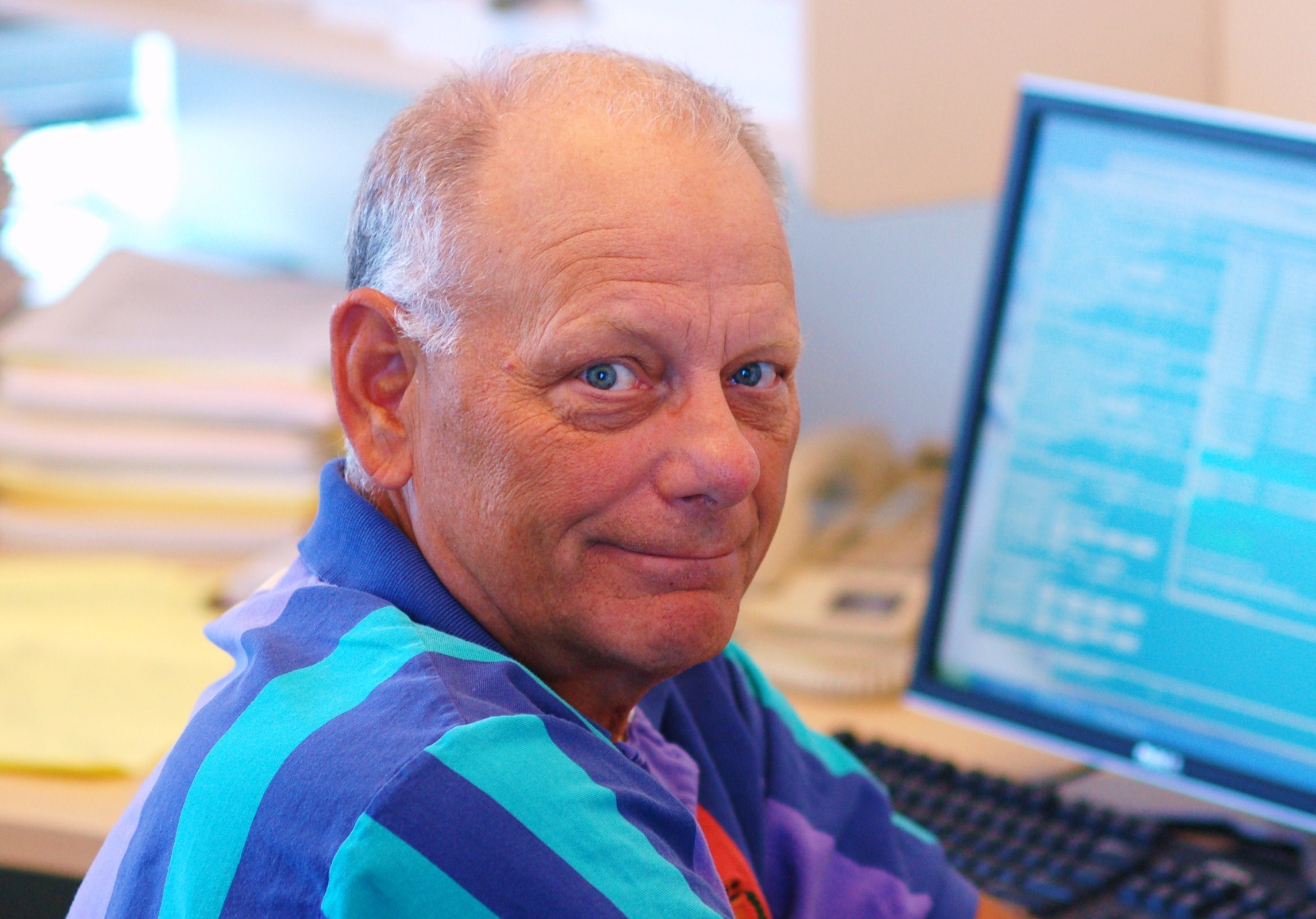
- Cutler in 2008
- Born: March 13, 1942 (age 84); Lansing, Michigan, U.S.
- Education: University of Olivet
- Known for: Developing several widely-used commercial operating systems: Microsoft: Windows NT; Digital Equipment Corporation: RSX-11M, VMS, VAXELN, MICA
- Scientific career
- Fields: Computer science; Operating system design
- Workplaces: DuPont; Digital Equipment Corporation; Microsoft (Note: As Senior Technical Fellow); University of Washington

David Neil Cutler Sr. (born March 13, 1942) is an American software engineer. He developed several computer operating systems, namely Microsoft Windows NT, and Digital Equipment Corporation's RSX-11M, VAXELN, VMS, and MICA.

== Personal history ==
Cutler was born in Lansing, Michigan and grew up in DeWitt, Michigan. After graduating from Olivet College, Michigan, in 1965, he went to work for DuPont.

Cutler holds at least 20 patents, and is affiliate faculty in the Computer Science Department at the University of Washington.

Cutler is an avid auto racing driver. He competed in the Atlantic Championship from 1996 to 2002, scoring a career best of 8th on the Milwaukee Mile in 2000.

Cutler was elected a member of the National Academy of Engineering in 1994 for the design and engineering of commercially successful operating systems.

Cutler is a member of Adelphic Alpha Pi Fraternity at Olivet College, Michigan.

== DuPont (1965 to 1971) ==
Cutler's first exposure to computers came when he was tasked to perform a computer simulations model for one of DuPont's customers using IBM's GPSS-3 language on an IBM model 7044. This work led to an interest in how computers and their operating systems worked.

== Digital Equipment Corporation (1971 to 1988) ==
Cutler left DuPont to pursue his interest in computer systems, beginning with Digital Equipment Corporation in 1971. He worked at Digital's headquarters in Maynard, Massachusetts.

=== RSX-11M ===
RSX-11M is a version of RSX-11, adapted from RSX-11D, that was made to have a smaller memory footprint. Dave Cutler was the leader of the RSX-11M project.

=== VMS ===
In April 1975, DEC began a hardware project, code-named Star, to design a 32-bit virtual address extension to its PDP-11. In June 1975, Cutler, together with Dick Hustvedt and Peter Lipman, were appointed the technical project leaders for the software project, code-named Starlet, to develop a totally new operating system for the Star family of processors. These two projects were tightly integrated from the beginning.

The three technical leaders of the Starlet project together with three technical leaders of the Star project formed the "Blue Ribbon Committee" at DEC that produced the fifth design evolution for the programs. The design featured simplifications to the memory management and process scheduling schemes of the earlier proposals and the architecture was accepted. The Star and Starlet projects culminated in the development of the VAX-11/780 superminicomputer and the VAX/VMS operating system, respectively.

=== PRISM and MICA projects ===
DEC began working on a new CPU using reduced instruction set computer (RISC) design principles in 1986. Cutler, who was working in DEC's DECwest facility in Bellevue, Washington, was selected to head PRISM, a project to develop the company's RISC machine. Its operating system, code named MICA, was to embody the next generation of design principles and have a compatibility layer for Unix and VMS. The RISC machine was to be based on emitter-coupled logic (ECL) technology, and was one of three ECL projects DEC was undertaking at the time.

Funding the research and development of multiple ECL projects yielding products that would ultimately compete against each other was a strain. Of the three ECL projects, the VAX 9000 was the only one that was directly commercialized. Primarily because of the early successes of the PMAX advanced development project and the need for differing business models, PRISM was canceled in 1988 in favor of PMAX.

PRISM later surfaced as the basis of DEC's Alpha family of computer systems.

=== Attitude towards Unix ===
Cutler is known for his disdain for Unix. Said one team member who worked with Cutler:

Unix is like Cutler's lifelong foe. It's like his Moriarty. He thinks Unix is a junk operating program designed by a committee of PhDs. There's never been one mind behind the whole thing, and it shows. So he's always been out to get Unix.

== Microsoft (1988 – present) ==
=== Microsoft Windows NT ===
Cutler left DEC for Microsoft in October 1988 and led the development of Windows NT. Later, he worked on targeting Windows NT to DEC's 64-bit Alpha architecture then on Windows 2000. After the demise of Windows on Alpha (and the demise of DEC), he was instrumental in porting Windows to AMD's new 64-bit AMD64 architecture. He was involved with the Windows XP Pro x64 and Windows Server 2003 SP1 x64 releases. He moved to working on Microsoft's Live Platform in August 2006. Cutler was awarded the prestigious status of Senior Technical Fellow at Microsoft.

=== Microsoft Windows Azure ===
At the 2008 Professional Developers Conference (PDC), Microsoft announced Azure Services Platform, an operating system based in cloud computing which Microsoft was developing and later became Microsoft Azure. During the conference keynote, Cutler was mentioned as a lead developer on the project, along with Amitabh Srivastava.

=== Microsoft Xbox ===
In January 2012, a spokesperson for Microsoft confirmed that Cutler was no longer working on Windows Azure, and had joined the Xbox team. In May 2013, Microsoft announced the Xbox One console, and Cutler was mentioned as having worked in developing the host OS of the new gaming device. Apparently his work was focused on creating an optimized version of Microsoft's Hyper-V Host OS specifically designed for Xbox One.

== Awards ==
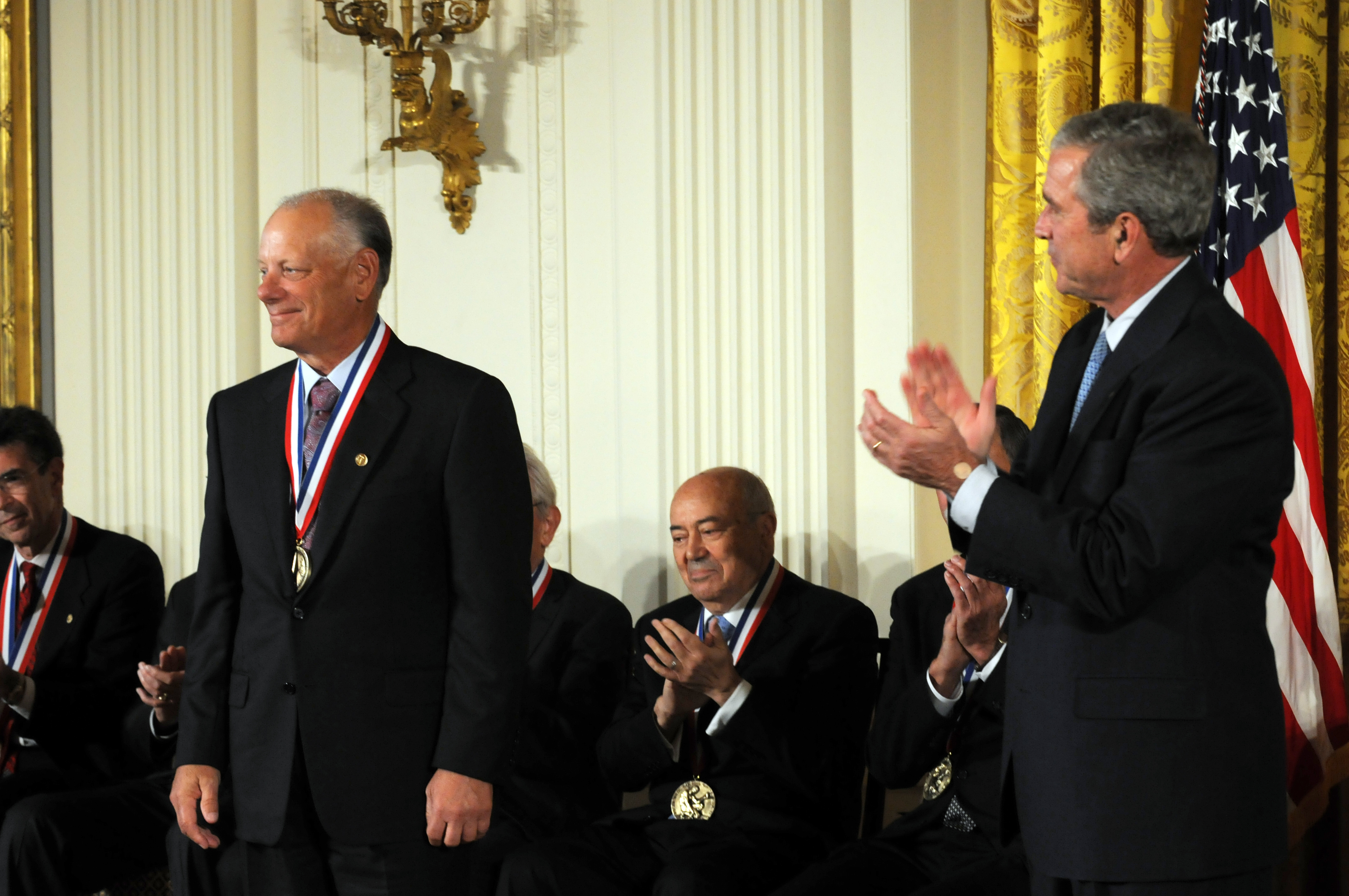
Cutler receiving the National Medal of Technology and Innovation in September 2008 from George W. Bush

- Recognized as a 2007 National Medal of Technology and Innovation Laureate, awarded on 29 September 2008 at a White House ceremony in Washington, DC.
- Honored as a Computer History Museum Fellow on 16 April 2016 at the Computer History Museum in Mountain View, California.

== See also ==
- List of pioneers in computer science

== Bibliography ==
- Zachary, G. Pascal (1994). Showstopper! The Breakneck Race to Create Windows NT and the Next Generation at Microsoft. Warner Books. ISBN 0-02-935671-7.
