= VAX 8000 =

Family of superminicomputers by Digital Equipment Corporation

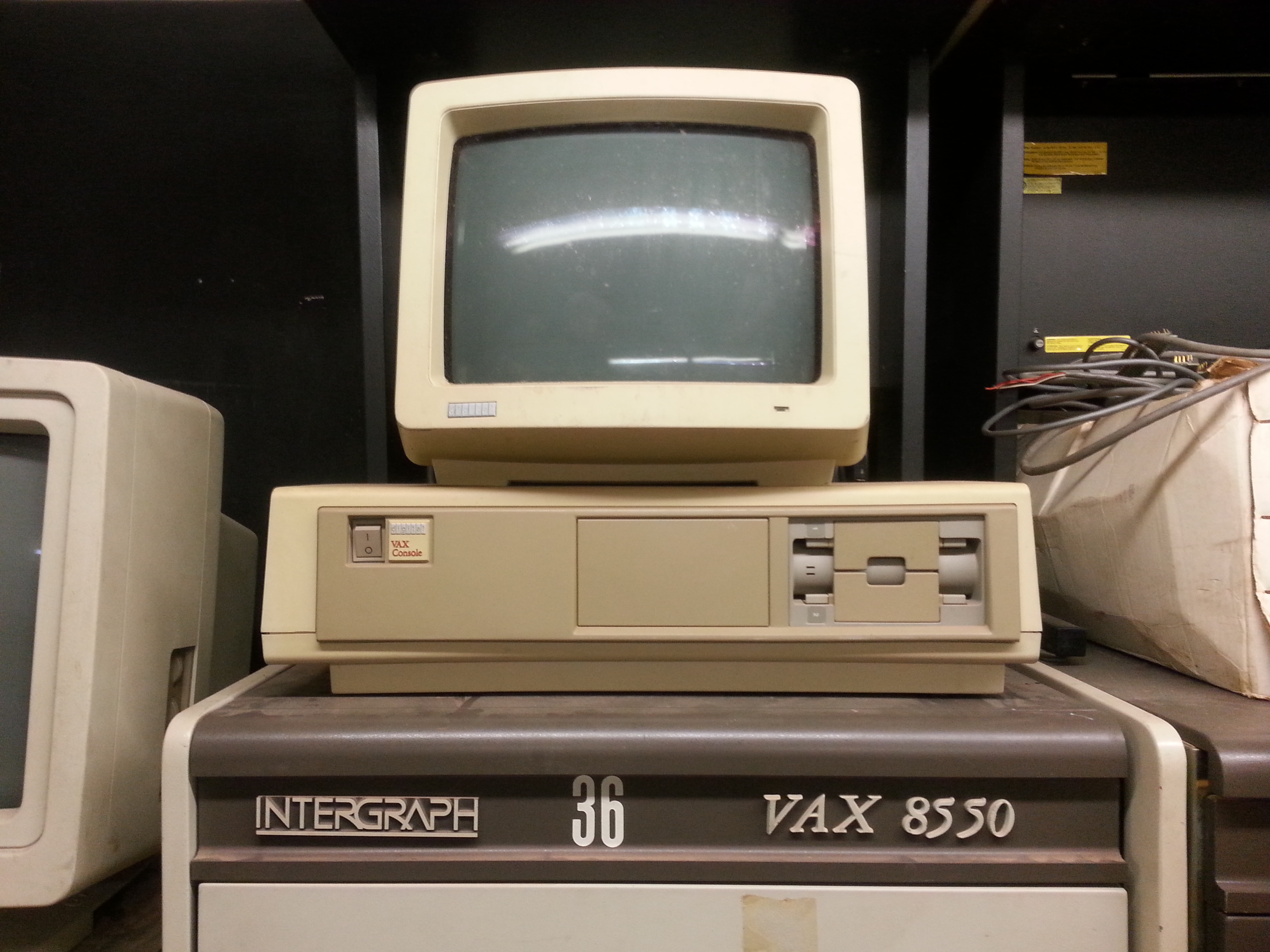
VAX 8550 with a DEC Professional console

The VAX 8000 is a discontinued family of superminicomputers developed and manufactured by Digital Equipment Corporation (DEC) using processors implementing the VAX instruction set architecture (ISA).

The 8000 series was introduced in October 1984 with the 8600, taking over the high end of the VAX lineup. Originally known as the 11/790, it offers performance roughly four times that of the earlier 11/780. It was succeeded by the 8650 (formerly the 11/795) in December 1985. January 1986 saw the introduction of the 8200 and 8300 families in the mid-range. The 8800 replaced the 8600s at the high end in 1987, with the 8700 and 8500 being lower-performance versions of these systems. DEC also offered various clusters of these machines with a variety of model numbers. As with other VAX systems, they were sold with either the VMS or Ultrix operating systems.

It was intended that the 8800 was to have been replaced by the VAX 9000 on the high end, but this project failed. Instead, the VAX 6000, originally a mid-range model replacing the 8700/8500, was upgraded to provide almost the same level of performance of the 8800 but at half the cost. All of these were replaced by the VAX 7000/10000 in July 1992. These are single-chip implementations based on the NVAX CPU and are the final dedicated VAX machines.

== VAX 8600 ==
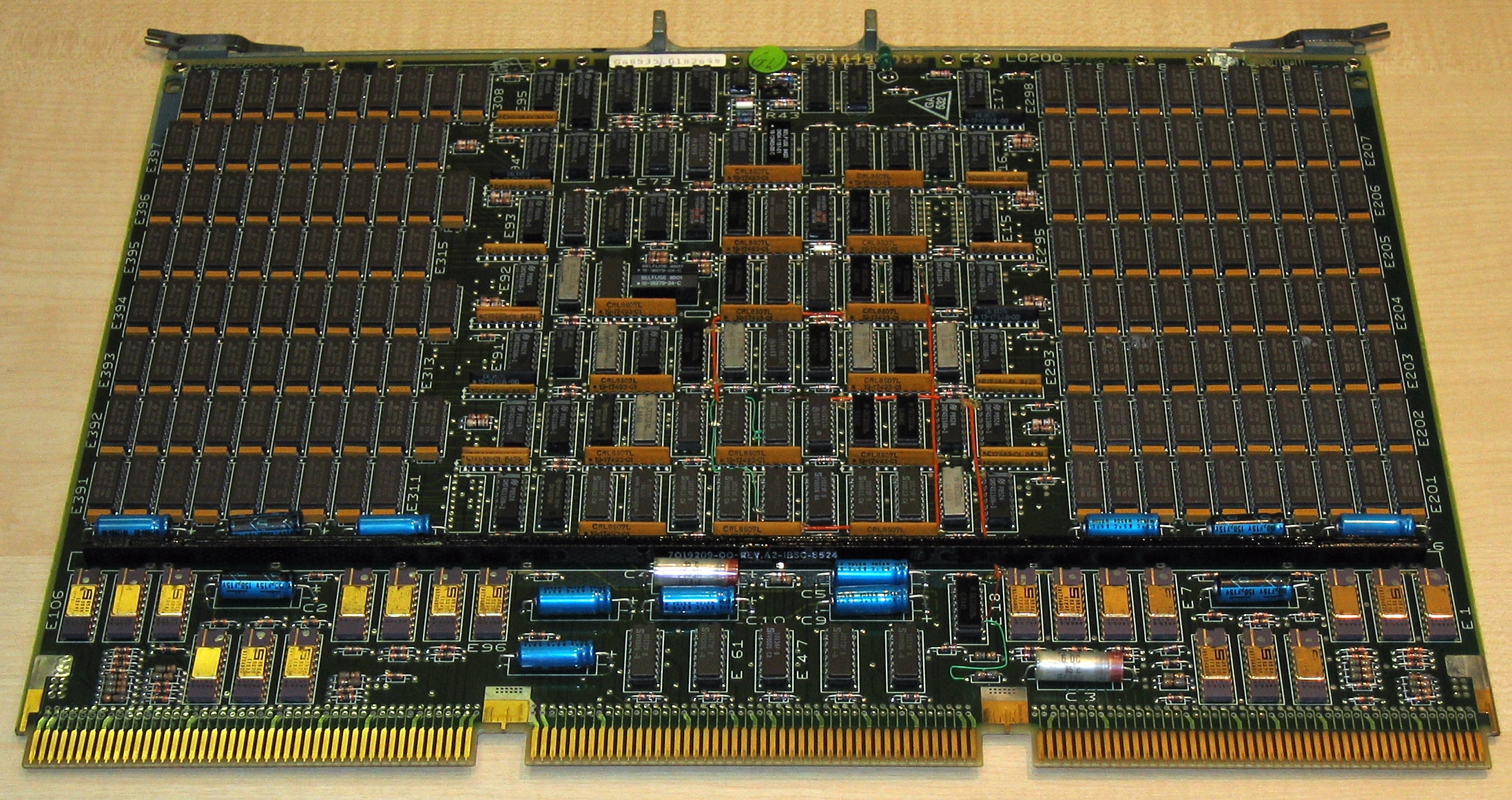
A 4 MB memory board for the VAX 8600

The VAX 8600, code-named "Venus", introduced in October 1984, is the successor of the VAX-11/785. It was originally to be named "VAX-11/790", but was renamed before launch. The VAX 8600 was a successful model and at the time was the best selling high-end VAX. It was succeeded by the VAX 8800 family in 1987.

The VAX 8600 has a CPU with an 80 ns cycle time (12.5 MHz) implemented with emitter coupled logic (ECL) macrocell arrays (MCAs). The CPU consists of four major logical sections, the E Box, F Box, I Box and M Box. The E Box executes all instructions, including floating-point instructions through microcode. It has an arithmetic logic unit (ALU) and barrel shifter. The F Box, or floating-point accelerator (FPA), is an optional feature that accelerates floating-point instructions as well as integer multiplication and division. It is a two-module set consisting of an adder module and multiplier module. The adder module contains 24 macrocell arrays while the multiplier module contains 21. The I Box fetches and decodes instructions. The M Box controls the memory and I/O, translates virtual addresses to physical addresses and contains a 16 KB data cache.

The CPU used 145 MCAs. These are large scale integration devices fabricated by Motorola in their 3 μm MOSAIC bipolar process. They are packaged in 68-pin leadless chip carriers or pin grid arrays and are mounted onto the printed circuit board in sockets or soldered in place. An additional 1,100 small scale integration (SSI) and medium scale integration (MSI) ECL logic devices are used. These ICs are spread out over 17 modules plugged into a backplane.

The VAX 8600 supports 4 to 512 MB of ECC memory and has eight slots on the backplane for memory modules. The system originally used 4 MB memory modules populated by 256 KBit metal oxide semiconductor (MOS) RAMs, which limits capacity to 32 MB. Modules with larger capacities were introduced later. The memory is controlled by the M Box, which also provides the memory array bus used to access the memory. This dedicated bus, which has an 80 ns (12.5 MHz) cycle time, contributes to the improved performance the VAX 8600 has over the VAX-11/780, which access memory via the Synchronous Backplane Interconnect (SBI) shared with I/O devices.

I/O is provided by the SBI. The VAX 8600 features one SBI but could be configured with two. The SBIs are provided by SBI adapters that interface the SBI to an internal adapter bus connected to the M Box. Each SBI has 16 slots for I/O devices, although only 15 are usable as one slot is reserved for the SBI adapter. With one SBI, that SBI has a bandwidth of 13.3 MB/s. With two SBIs, they have a total bandwidth of 17.1 MB/s. The adapter bus that interfaces the SBIs to the M Box has a bandwidth of 33.3 MB/s. Unibus and Massbus are also supported, provided by adapters that plug into the SBI. The VAX 8600 I/O cabinet contains a PDP-11 computer serving as the console, a Unibus card cage and provisions for mounting disk drives.

=== VAX 8650 ===
The VAX 8650, code-named "Morningstar", is a faster version of the VAX 8600 introduced on 4 December 1985. It was originally to be named "VAX-11/795", but was renamed before launch. The VAX 8600 is the last VAX to be 100% compatible with the VAX-11/780 and VAX-11/785, to have the PDP-11 compatibility mode, and to use the SBI also used by the VAX-11/78x. The CPU has a 55 ns cycle time (18.18 MHz).

== VAX 8200 and VAX 8300 ==
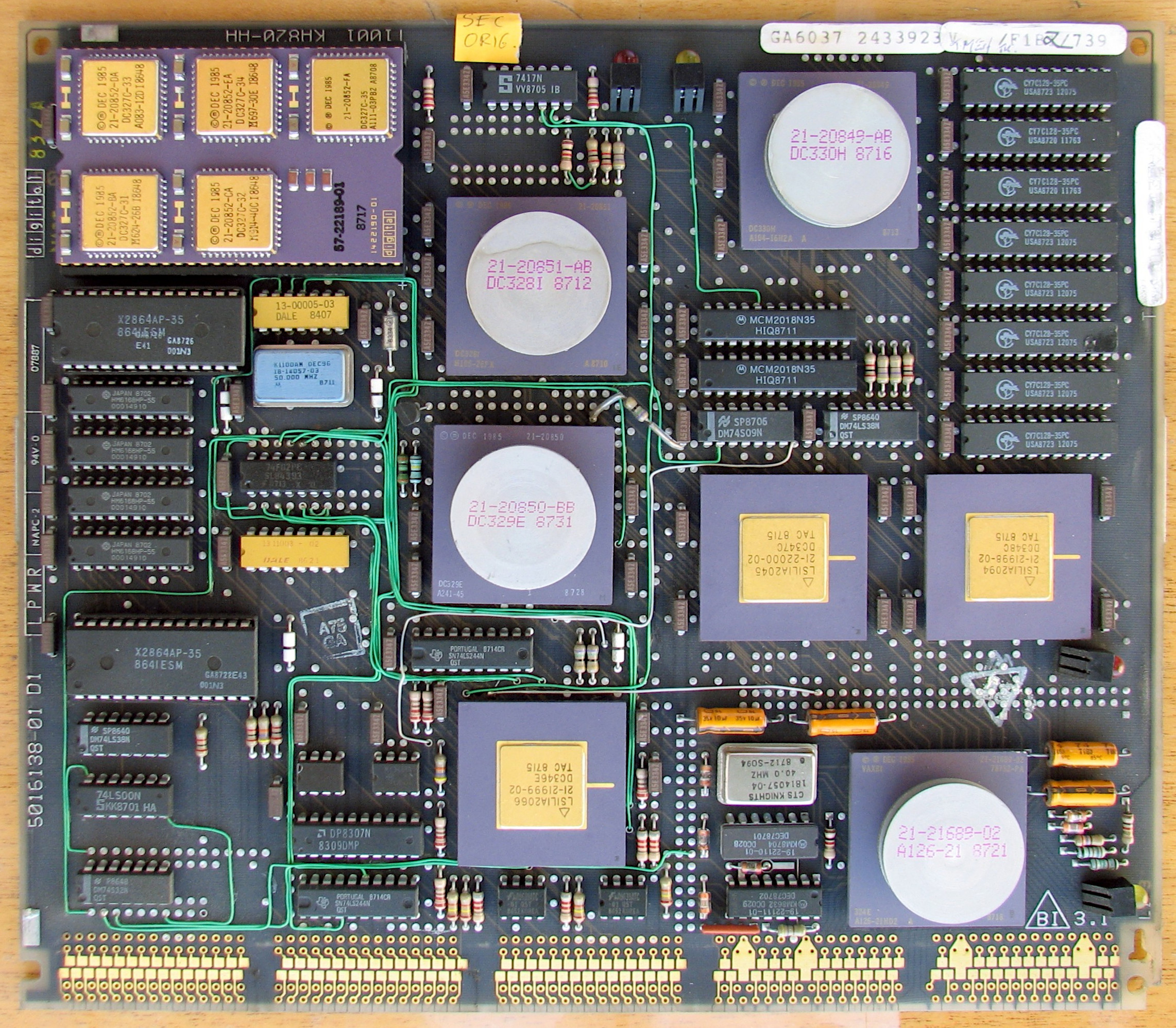
KA820-AA CPU module

The VAX 8200 and VAX 8300, code named "Scorpio", are mid-range minicomputers introduced on 29 January 1986. The VAX 8300 is a dual-processor variant of the VAX 8200 and, with the VAX 8800 introduced on the same date, are among the first multiprocessor VAX computers. They use the KA820 CPU module containing a V-11 microprocessor operating at 5 MHz (200 ns cycle) and support a maximum of 128 MB of ECC memory. It has one VAXBI bus and support for an optional Unibus.

=== VAX 8250 and VAX 8350 ===
The VAX 8250 and VAX 8350 are faster models of the VAX 8200 and VAX 8300 introduced in early March 1987. They use the KA825 CPU module containing a V-11 microprocessor operating at 6.25 MHz (160 ns cycle).

== VAX 8800 family ==
=== VAX 8800 ===
Code-named "Nautilus", this is the high-end model in the VAX 8800 family. It features two CPUs and two VAXBI buses as standard. The VAX 8800 CPU is a heavily pipelined design, slightly predating the first commercial MIPS and SPARC designs. Development of the VAX 8800 began in August–November 1982 and it was introduced on 29 January 1986. When "Polarstar" systems and a new naming convention were introduced, the VAX 8800 was renamed to VAX 8820N to distinguish it from the VAX 8820 "Polarstar". After the name adjustments and upgrading to full SMP capability, the former VAX 8700 and VAX 8800 models became VAX 88x0 machines, where "x" represented the number of CPUs, i.e. VAX 8810, 8820, 8830 and 8840. The upgrade kit includes replacement numbers affixed to the front of the machine to reflect the new designation.

=== VAX 8700 ===
The VAX 8700, code-named "Nautilus", was introduced in early August 1986. It is similar to the VAX 8800, but with one CPU and VAXBI bus. It is upgradable to a VAX 8800. It became a VAX 8810 after the SMP upgrade and revised naming convention.

=== VAX 8550 ===
The VAX 8550, code-named "Skipjack", was introduced in early August 1986. It is similar to the VAX 8700, but is not upgradable to the VAX 8800.

=== VAX 8500 ===
The VAX 8500, code-named "Flounder", is a lower-performance variant of the VAX 8550, with microcode used to insert NOPs during operation to limit performance.

=== VAX 8530 ===
The VAX 8530, code-named "Skipjack", is an upgraded VAX 8500 with the NOPs removed for improved performance. It was introduced in early March 1987.

=== Polarstar ===
Polarstar is a variant of Nautilus with one to four processors and an updated console processor. Models include the:

- VAX 8810 - A single-processor system
- VAX 8820 - A two-processor system
- VAX 8842 - A cluster of two VAX 8820 systems
- VAX 8830 - A three-processor system
- VAX 8840 - A four-processor system
- VAX 8974 - Introduced on 20 January 1987, it is a cluster of four VAX 8700 systems
- VAX 8978 - introduced on 20 January 1987, it is a cluster of eight VAX 8700 systems

=== Description ===
The VAX 8800 family is based on the NMI bus, which connects the CPU, memory controller and I/O adapters. The NMI bus is a 32-bit synchronous bus with a usable bandwidth of 64 MB/s.

==== CPU ====
The VAX 8800 family central processing unit (CPU) operates at 22.22 MHz (45 ns cycle time) and is implemented with discrete emitter-coupled logic (ECL) devices spread over eight modules. The majority of the ECL devices are macrocell arrays with 1,200 logic gates, while the general-purpose registers and floating-point units are custom logic devices developed by Digital. The CPU has 64 KB of cache implemented with 10 ns and 15 ns ECL random access memory devices.

The processor employs "deep pipelining" through the utilisation of "uniform microinstructions" as opposed to attempting to pipeline VAX instructions. Its five-stage pipeline starts with an initial decode stage that generates microaddresses for each decoded machine instruction, these referencing microcode routines in the control store that provide the microinstructions required in order to perform the complete machine instruction. Such microaddresses are employed by the second pipeline stage, concerned with control store lookup and sequencing. The elements of each microinstruction are then employed by the subsequent pipeline stages, the third stage being concerned with operand and register reading, the fourth with execution involving arithmetic and floating-point computation, and the fifth involving register and memory writing. Machine instructions implemented using multiple microcode instructions cause such microinstructions to be scheduled and to proceed through the pipeline without the next machine instruction being fetched and decoded, this only occurring at the end of the microinstruction sequence.

==== Memory ====
The VAX 8800 and 8700 support one to eight memory array modules; the VAX 8550 and 8500, one to five memory modules. The memory array modules are installed in a dedicated backplane separate from the NMI backplane. The VAX 8800 and VAX 8700 support 4 to 32 MB of memory, the VAX 8500 and VAX 8550 4 to 20 MB, using the 4 MB memory module. When the 16 MB memory module was introduced, the memory capacity of the VAX 8800 and 8700 increased to 128 MB, and that of the VAX 8550 and 8500 to 80 MB. Additionally when the 64 MB memory module was introduced, the memory capacity of the VAX 8800 and 8700 increased to 512 MB and that of the VAX 8550 and 8500 to 320MB.

The memory system consists of three major parts, a memory controller, a transistor-transistor logic (TTL) bus and one to eight memory array modules. The memory controller is implemented with ECL gate arrays and resides on an NMI bus module. It implements a TTL bus to which memory array modules are connected. Three memory modules were available for the VAX 8800: a 4 MB module, a 16 MB module and a 64 MB module. The 4 MB array module is an eight-layer printed circuit board populated by metal oxide semiconductor (MOS) dynamic random access memory (DRAM) devices and medium-scale integration (MSI) FAST transistor-transistor logic (TTL) devices in roughly equal numbers. The 16 MB array module is similar to the 4 MB module, but contains eight surface-mounted daughter boards, each containing 2 MB of memory built from DRAMs.

==== I/O ====
The VAX 8800 uses the VAXBI bus for input/output. The VAX 8800 supports up to four VAXBI buses, with each bus supporting up to 16 I/O devices. The VAXBI bus is interfaced to the NMI bus by a NBI adapter containing a chip implementing the VAXBI bus protocol. The NBI adapter handles all CPU references and direct memory access (DMA) transactions to and from the I/O devices. The adapter operates at 5 MHz and asynchronously to the CPU as it generates its own clock signal. The NBI adapter consists of two modules, the NBIA and NBIB. The NBIA is the NMI side of the adapter, and the NBIB the VAXBI side.

==== VAX Console ====
The VAX Console is a DEC Professional Series PC-38N. This is a PRO-380 with a real-time interface (RTI) that is used as the console for the Nautilus family of processors. The RTI has two serial line units: one connects to the VAX environmental monitoring module (EMM) and the other is a spare that can be used for data transfer. The RTI's IEEE-488 interface is unused. The RTI's programmable 24-bit peripheral interface (PPI) is configured as three 8-bit ports for data, address, and control signals between the Nautilus system console interface and the VAX console. The console's primary function is to bootstrap the system. The Nautilus family of processors has no non-volatile memory. The console sets configuration registers, loads CPU microcode into the writeable controls store, performs processor module diagnostic tests, resets the TOY clock (time-of-year clock), logs certain types of errors, performs other supervisory functions, and is the interface for field service diagnosis and testing.

== Bibliography ==
- "Digital Models". The New York Times. 6 August 1986.
- "Digital Upgrades". The New York Times. 5 March 1987.
- "New Digital Machine Set". The New York Times. 4 December 1985.
- Burley, Robert M. (February 1987). "An Overview of the Four Systems in the VAX 8800 Family" (PDF). Digital Technical Journal. 1 (4). ISBN 978-1-55558-001-8.
- Natusch, Paul J.; Senerchia, David C.; Yu, Eugene L. (February 1987). "The Memory System in the VAX 8800 Family" (PDF). Digital Technical Journal. 1 (4). ISBN 978-1-55558-001-8.
- Fossum, Tryggve; McElroy, James B.; English, William (August 1985). "An overview of the VAX 8600 system" (PDF). Digital Technical Journal. 1 (1): 8–23.
