= List of Soviet microprocessors =

Both microcontrollers and microprocessors (including bit-slice processors and DSPs) from the Soviet Union are listed here. Newer devices from Russia, Belarus, and Ukraine are listed here if they are labelled according to the Soviet integrated circuit designation.

Soviet series	Western equivalent	Word size (bit)	Technology	Type	Instruction set	Remarks
145			CMOS, PMOS, other	controller		К145 is a combined series with different IC technology and purpose К145ИК1807
532		4n	CMOS	bit-slice	Elektronika NC	series later renamed to 587
536		8n	PMOS	bit-slice	Elektronika S5	К536ИК9
580	Intel 8080	8	NMOS	processor		КР580ВМ80А
581	Western Digital MCP-1600	16	NMOS	processor	PDP-11	КР581ИК1
582	Texas Instruments SBP0400	4n	I²L	bit-slice		КР582ИК1
583		8n	I²L	bit-slice		К583ВС1А
584	Texas Instruments SBP0400	4n	I²L	bit-slice		К584ВМ1
585	Intel 3000	2n	Schottky TTL	bit-slice		К585ИК02
586		16	NMOS	processor	Elektronika S5 (Электроника C5)	К586ВЕ1
587		4n	CMOS	bit-slice	Elektronika NC (Электроника НЦ)	КР587ИК1
588		16	CMOS	processor	PDP-11	КР588ВС2А
589	Intel 3000	2n	Schottky TTL	bit-slice		К589ИК02
602	MCS 65C02	8	CMOS	processor		К602ВМ1
1005	Panasonic MN1405	4	NMOS	controller		КР1005ВЕ1
1011			PMOS	controller		К1011ВГ101
1013		16	CMOS	processor	PDP-11	КА1013ВМ1
1582	Zilog Z84C00	8	CMOS	processor		КМ1582ВМ2
1800	Motorola MC10800	4n	ECL	bit-slice		К1800ВC1
1801		16	NMOS	controller	Elektronika NC	К1801ВЕ1
1801		16	NMOS	processor	PDP-11	1801BMx
1802		8n	Schottky TTL	bit-slice		КР1802ВС1
1803		4	PMOS	controller		КР1803ВЕ1
1804	AMD Am2900	4n	Schottky TTL	bit-slice		КР1804ВС1
1805		4n	CMOS	bit-slice		КБ1805ВС1-1
1806		4	CMOS	controller		КР1806ВЕ1
1806		16	CMOS	processor	PDP-11	1806ВМ2
1807	DEC T-11	16	NMOS	processor	PDP-11	КР1807ВМ1
1807	DEC MicroVAX	32	NMOS	processor	VAX	КЛ1807ВМ3
1808		8	I²L	controller		КА1808ВМ1
1810	Intel 8086	16	NMOS	processor	x86	К1810ВМ86
1810	Intel 8088	16	NMOS	processor	x86	К1810ВМ88
1811	DEC F-11	16	NMOS	processor	PDP-11	КН1811ВМ1
1813	Intel 2920	24	NMOS	DSP		КМ1813ВЕ1А
1814	Texas Instruments TMS1000	4	PMOS	controller		КР1814ВЕ2
1815		16	I²L	DSP		К1815ИА1
1816	Intel 8048	8	NMOS	controller	MCS-48	КМ1816ВЕ48
1816	Intel 8051	8	NMOS	controller	MCS-51	КР1816ВЕ51
1817		8n	Schottky TTL	bit-slice		1817ВС11А
1818	Signetics 8X300	8	Schottky TTL	processor		КМ1818ВМ01
1819		4n	CMOS	bit-slice		1819ИК2
1820	National Semiconductor COP400	4	NMOS	controller		КР1820ВЕ1
1820	National Semiconductor COP400	4	CMOS	controller		КР1820ВЕ3
1821	Intel 80C85	8	CMOS	processor		ИМ1821ВМ85А
1822		8n		bit-slice		1822ВС1
1824		16	CMOS	processor	PDP-11	1824ВС21
1825		16 / 32	CMOS	processor		Б1825ВС1-2
1826		8	CMOS	processor		1826ВМ1А
1827		16	NMOS	controller	Elektronika S5	К1827ВЕ1
1827		16	NMOS	DSP		КМ1827ВЕ3
1829	NEC μPD7500	4	CMOS	controller		КА1829ВМ1
1830	Intel 80C48	8	CMOS	controller	MCS-48	КР1830ВЕ48
1830	Intel 80C51	8	CMOS	controller	MCS-51	КМ1830ВЕ751
1831	DEC J-11	16	CMOS	processor	PDP-11	КН1831ВМ1
1832		16	Schottky TTL	DSP		КН1832ИА1
1833		6	CMOS	controller		КР1833ВЕ1
1834	Intel 80C86	16	CMOS	processor	x86	КР1834ВМ86
1835		16	CMOS	controller		КФ1835ВЕ3
1835	Intel 80C48	8	CMOS	controller	MCS-48	КР1835ВЕ49
1835	Intel 80C51	8	CMOS	controller	MCS-51	КР1835ВЕ51
1835	Intel 80C86	16	CMOS	processor	x86	КР1835ВМ86
1836		16	CMOS	processor	PDP-11	Н1836ВМ3
1838	AMD Am29500	8n	Schottky TTL	bit-slice		1838ВС1
1839		32	CMOS	processor	VAX	Л1839ВМ1
1843	AMD Am29C300	32	CMOS	processor		КА1843ВС1
1845		32	CMOS	processor		КА1845ВС1
1847	Intel 80C286	16	CMOS	processor	x86	КР1847ВМ286
1850	Intel 8048	8	NMOS	controller	MCS-48	КР1850ВЕ48
1851		8	CMOS	controller		1851ВЕ51У
1858	Zilog Z80	8	NMOS	processor		КР1858ВМ1
1858	Zilog Z84C00	8	CMOS	processor		КР1858ВМ3
1865		16	CMOS	processor		К1865ВМ1
1867	Texas Instruments TMS320	16 / 32	CMOS	DSP		Л1867ВМ2
1868	Panasonic MN1500	4	CMOS	controller		КЛ1868ВЕ1
1869	Mitsubishi M50959	8	CMOS	controller		КФ1869ВЕ1
1869		4	CMOS	controller		КФ1869ВЕ2
1871		4	CMOS	controller		КН1871ВЕ1
1874	Intel 80C196	16	CMOS	controller	MCS-96	Л1874ВЕ36
1875	Intel 80C186	16	CMOS	processor	x86	1875ВД1Т
1875	Intel 80386EXTB	32	CMOS	processor	x86	1875ВД2Т
1876	MIPS R3000	32	CMOS	processor	MIPS	Л1876ВМ1
1878		8	CMOS	controller	Theseus	КР1878ВЕ1
1879		32	CMOS	DSP		1879ВМ1
1879		32	CMOS	processor + DSP	ARM	1879ВЯ1Я
1880	Intel 80C51	8	CMOS	controller	MCS-51	1880ВЕ51Р
1881		16	CMOS	controller		1881ВЕ2Т
1882		8	CMOS	controller	MCS-51	1882ВЕ53У
1883	ZMD U830C	8n	NMOS	bit-slice	PDP-11	U830C
1886	Microchip PIC17C756A	8	CMOS	controller	PIC17	К1886ВЕ2У
1887	Infineon C166	16	CMOS	controller	C166	1887ВЕ3Т
1887	Atmel ATmega	8	CMOS	controller	AVR	1887ВЕ4У
1888		32	CMOS	controller + DSP	ARM	К1888ВС018
1888		32	CMOS	processor + DSP	PowerPC	1888ТХ018
1890		32	CMOS	processor	MIPS	1890ВМ1Т
1890		64	CMOS	processor	MIPS	1890ВМ5Ф
1891		32	CMOS	processor	SPARC	1891ВМ3
1891			CMOS	processor	Elbrus 2000	1891ВМ4Я
1892		32	CMOS	processor + DSP	MIPS	1892ВМ2Я
1892		32	CMOS	processor + DSP	ARM	1892ВМ14Я
1894		16	CMOS	controller	TF-16	К1894ВГ1Т
1899		32	CMOS	processor		1899ВМ1Т
1900		32	CMOS	processor	MIPS	1900ВМ2Т
1901	Texas Instruments TMS320	32 / 16		controller + DSP	ARM	1901ВЦ1Т
1902			CMOS	DSP		1902ВЦ1Я
1903	Texas Instruments MSP430F149	16		controller	MSP 430	1903ВЕ91Т
1904		32	CMOS	controller	MIPS	1904ВЕ1Т
1905				controller		К1905ВМ1Я
1906	LEON4	32	CMOS	processor	SPARC	1906BМ016
1907		32	CMOS	processor	MIPS	1907ВМ014
1907		64	CMOS	processor	MIPS	1907ВМ028
1910	Texas Instruments TMS320C546	16	CMOS	DSP		1910ВМ1Т
1913		16	CMOS	controller	TF-16	1913ВА015
1914		32	CMOS	processor	ARM	1914ВМ014
1917		32		controller	ARM	К1917ВА014
1921		32	CMOS	controller	ARM	К1921ВК01Т
1921		32		controller	RISC-V	1921ВК048
1923		32		controller	ARM	1923ВК014
1931		32	CMOS	controller	RISC-V	1931ВА018
1938		32		controller	KVARC	1938ВМ014
1946		32	CMOS	controller	ARM	К1946ВК028
1948		32		controller	RISC-V	К1948ВК018
1967	Texas Instruments TMS320C546	16	CMOS	DSP		1967ВЦ1Т
1967	Analog Devices TigerSHARC	32	CMOS	DSP		1967ВЦ3Т
1986		32	CMOS	controller	ARM	1986ВЕ9х
1990		32	CMOS	processor	MIPS	1990ВМ2Т
1990		64	CMOS	processor	MIPS	1990ВМ3Т
5001		32	CMOS	controller	ARM	КА5001ВК1А
5004		8	CMOS	controller	Theseus	КБ5004ВЕ1
5023		32	CMOS	controller	ARM	5023ВС016
5400		8	CMOS	controller	MCS-51	5400ВК015
5400		32	CMOS	controller	RISC-V	5400ТР194
5500		64	CMOS	processor	MIPS	К5500ВК018
5510		32	CMOS	controller	RISC-V	5510ТС018
5512		32	CMOS	controller	KVARC	К5512БП1Ф
5512		32	CMOS	controller	MIPS	К5512БП2Ф
5534		16	CMOS	controller	MSP 430	5534ТХ014
5539		32	CMOS	controller	KVARC	5539ТР016
5550		8		controller		5550ХТ015
5701	Intel 80C51	8	CMOS	controller	MCS-51	УМ5701ВЕ51
5890		32	CMOS	processor	MIPS	5890ВЕ1Т

== See also ==
- List of Russian microprocessors
- Commons:Gallery of Soviet integrated circuits
