= VAXBI =

Bus for VAX computers

- VAX Bus Interconnect
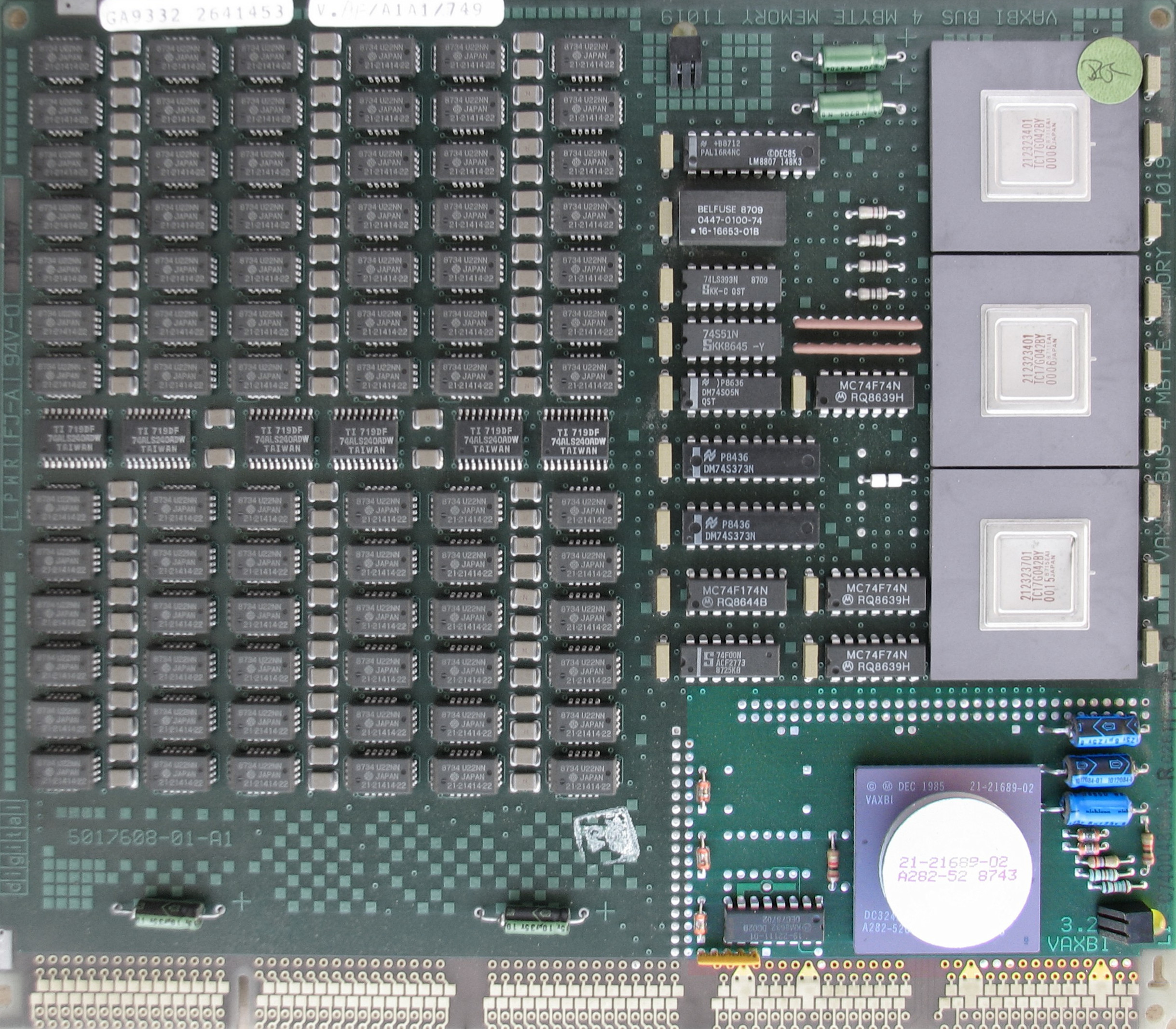
- VAX ECC memory card with VAXBI interface highlighted
- Year created: 1986; 39 years ago
- Created by: Digital Equipment Corporation
- Width in bits: 32

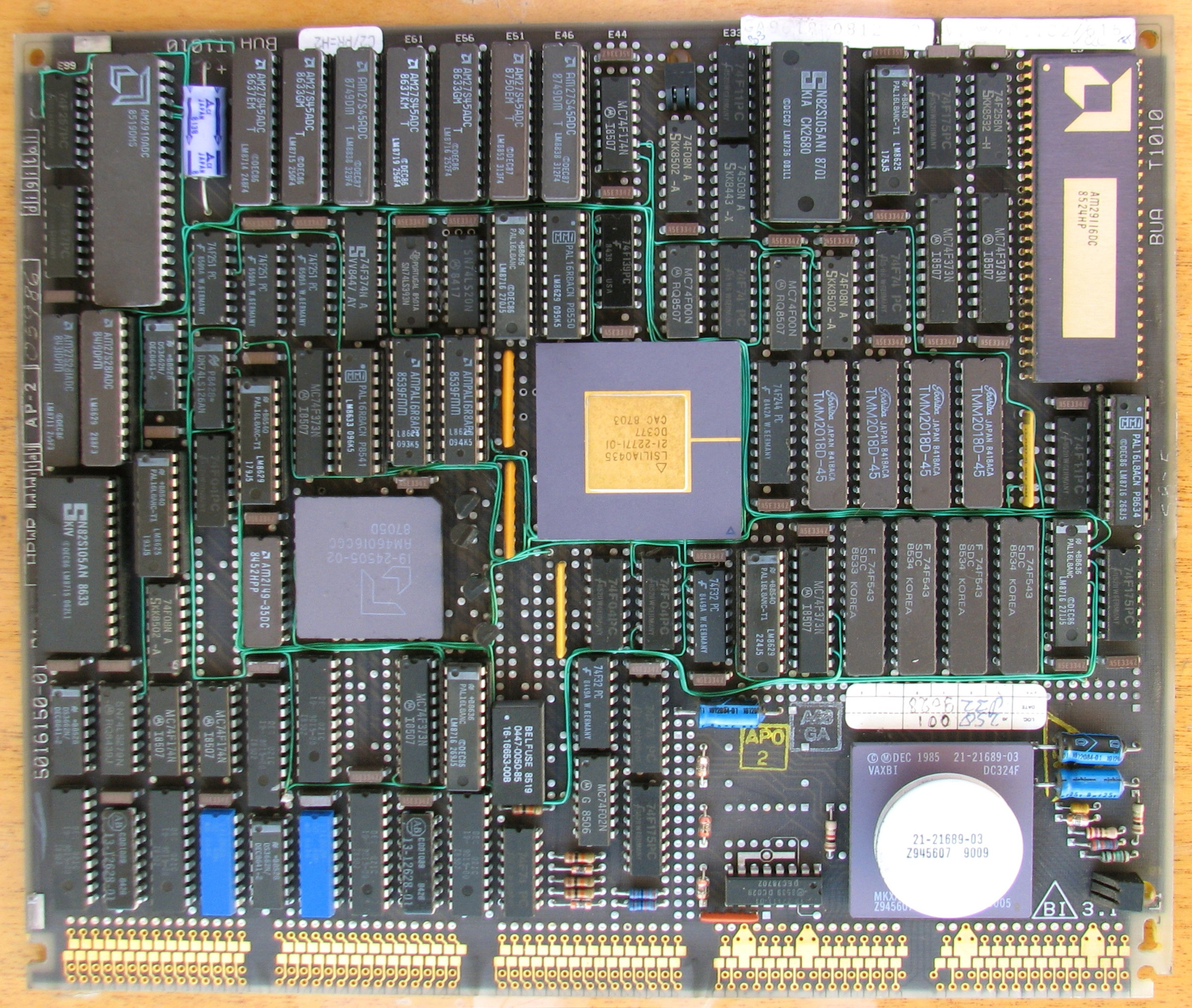
VAX BI to Unibus adapter.

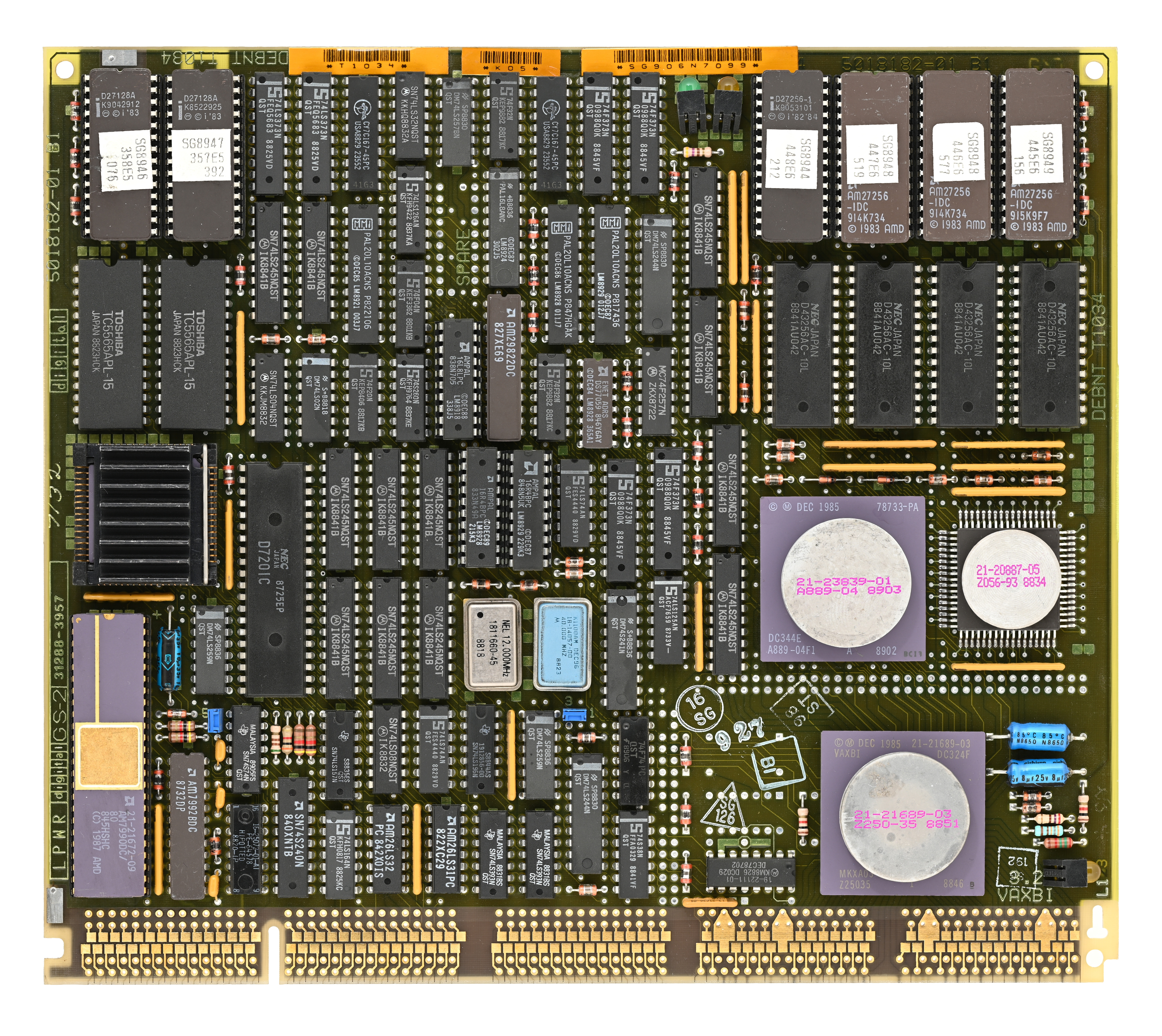
Ethernet and tape drive controller

VAXBI (VAX Bus Interconnect) is a computer bus designed and sold by Digital Equipment Corporation (DEC), introduced in 1986.

The bus is an advanced, configuration-free synchronous bus used on DEC's later VAX computers. Like the Unibus and Q-Bus before it, it uses memory-mapped I/O but has 32-bit address and data paths. The VAXBI is a multiplexed bus with fully distributed arbitration and geographic addressing.

All of the logic required to implement a VAXBI interface is contained within a single custom integrated circuit (the "BIIC") and the physical layout and printed wiring board layout for compliant cards is tightly specified, right down to the location of the dual amber status LEDs that are required. The portion of the card that is reserved for the bus interface is referred to as "the VAXBI corner". VAXBI licensees were given the appropriate engineering drawings to allow them to exactly replicate a compliant card.

VAXBI expansion cards mount into backplanes using a ZIF connector; depending on the backplane design, cards can be loaded from the top or the front side of the backplane. No cable connections are permitted on the cards; all connections are made via three uncommitted rows of backplane connectors. Similarly, no configuration jumpers are permitted on the cards; all setup is done by jumpers inserted on the backplane connectors or via software configuration.

Originally conceived by its engineers to be an open bus, it was forced to be a tightly licensed bus by Digital's marketing and management, and was not nearly as successful as had originally been hoped for.

It is used in the VAX 6000, VAX 8000 (82xx, 83xx, 85xx, 87xx, 88xx models) and the VAX 9000 systems and also on the MIPS R3000 based DECsystem 5800 series.

A PDP-11 implementation (the PDP-11/27) was envisioned but never advanced beyond the concept stage.
