= DVK =

Soviet family of personal computers

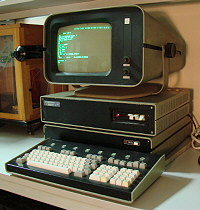
- DVK-2
- Also known as: Elektronika MS-0501; Elektronika MS-0502
- Type: Personal computer
- Released: 1983
- CPU: K1801VM1 or K1801VM2 microprocessors; KM1801VM3 microprocessor in later models

DVK (Russian: ДВК, Диалоговый вычислительный комплекс, Interactive Computing Complex) is a Soviet PDP-11-compatible personal computer. It was designed by the Research Institute of Precision Technology in Zelenograd.

== Overview ==
The design is also known as Elektronika MS-0501 and Elektronika MS-0502.

Early models of the DVK series are based on K1801VM1 or K1801VM2 microprocessors with a 16 bit address bus. Later models use the KM1801VM3 microprocessor with a 22 bit extended address bus.

== Models ==
- DVK-1
- DVK-1M
- DVK-2
- DVK-2M
- DVK-3
- DVK-3M2
- Kvant 4C (aka DVK-4)
- DVK-4M
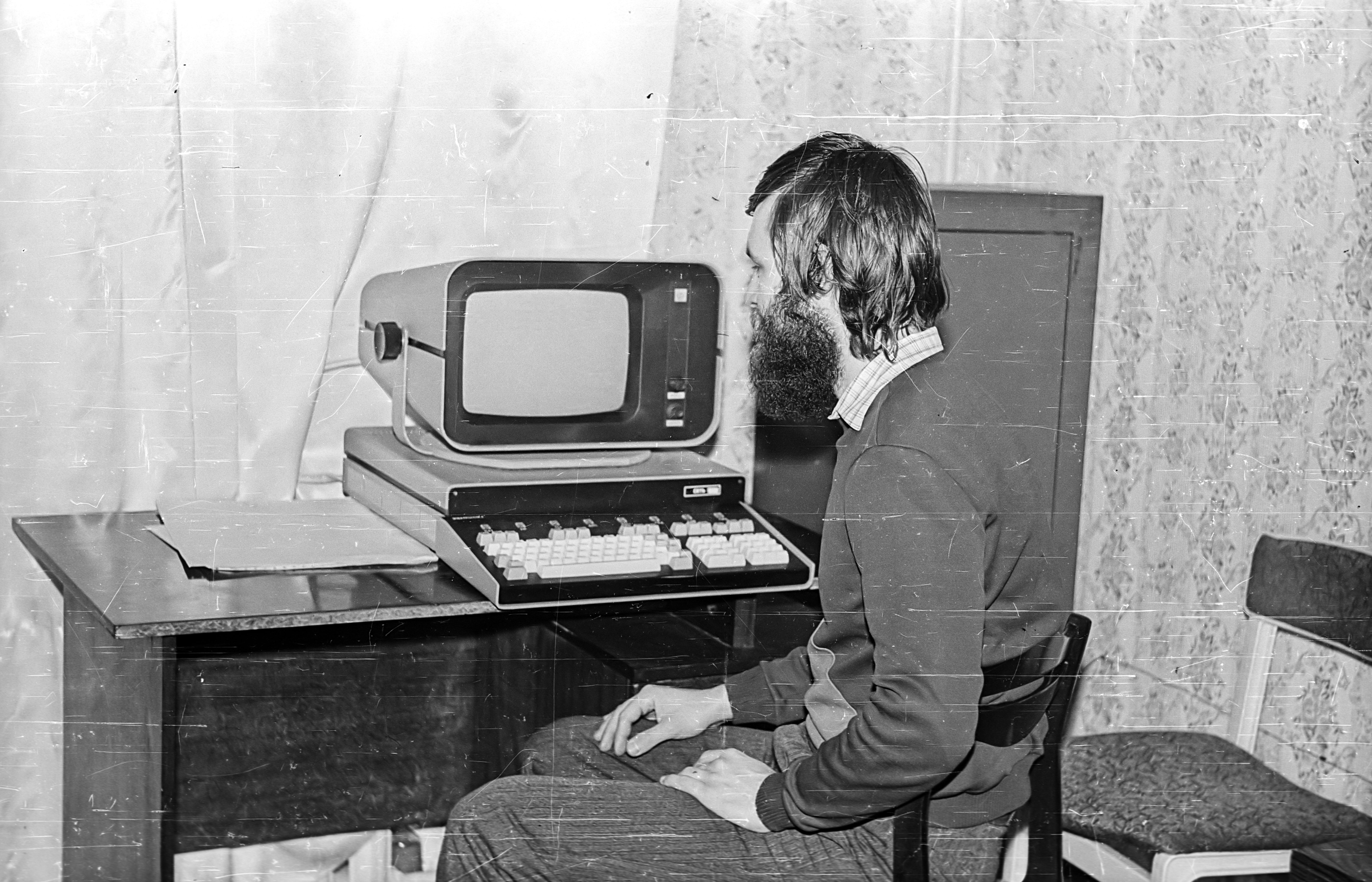
DVK-1

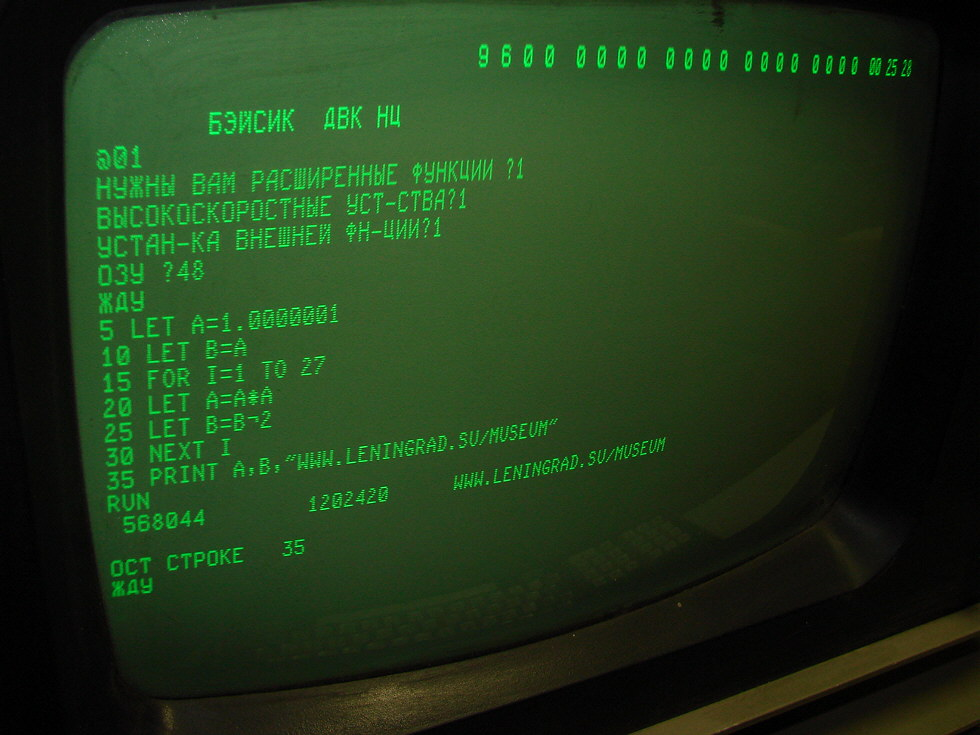
BASIC interpreter on the DVK computer

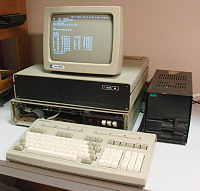
DVK-2M

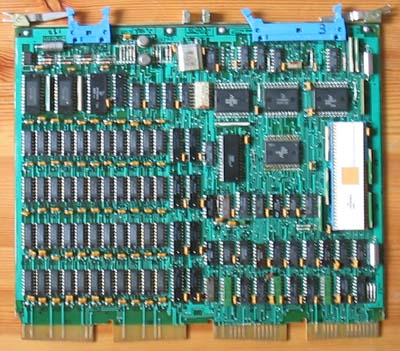
DVK-3 CPU

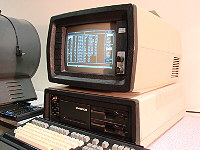
DVK-3

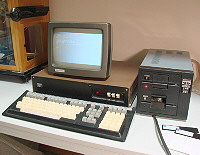
DVK-3M2

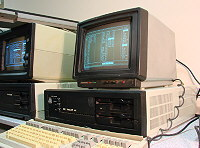
Kvant 4C (aka DVK-4)

== See also ==
- Elektronika BK-0010
- SM EVM
- UKNC
