= UKNC =

Soviet home and educational computer

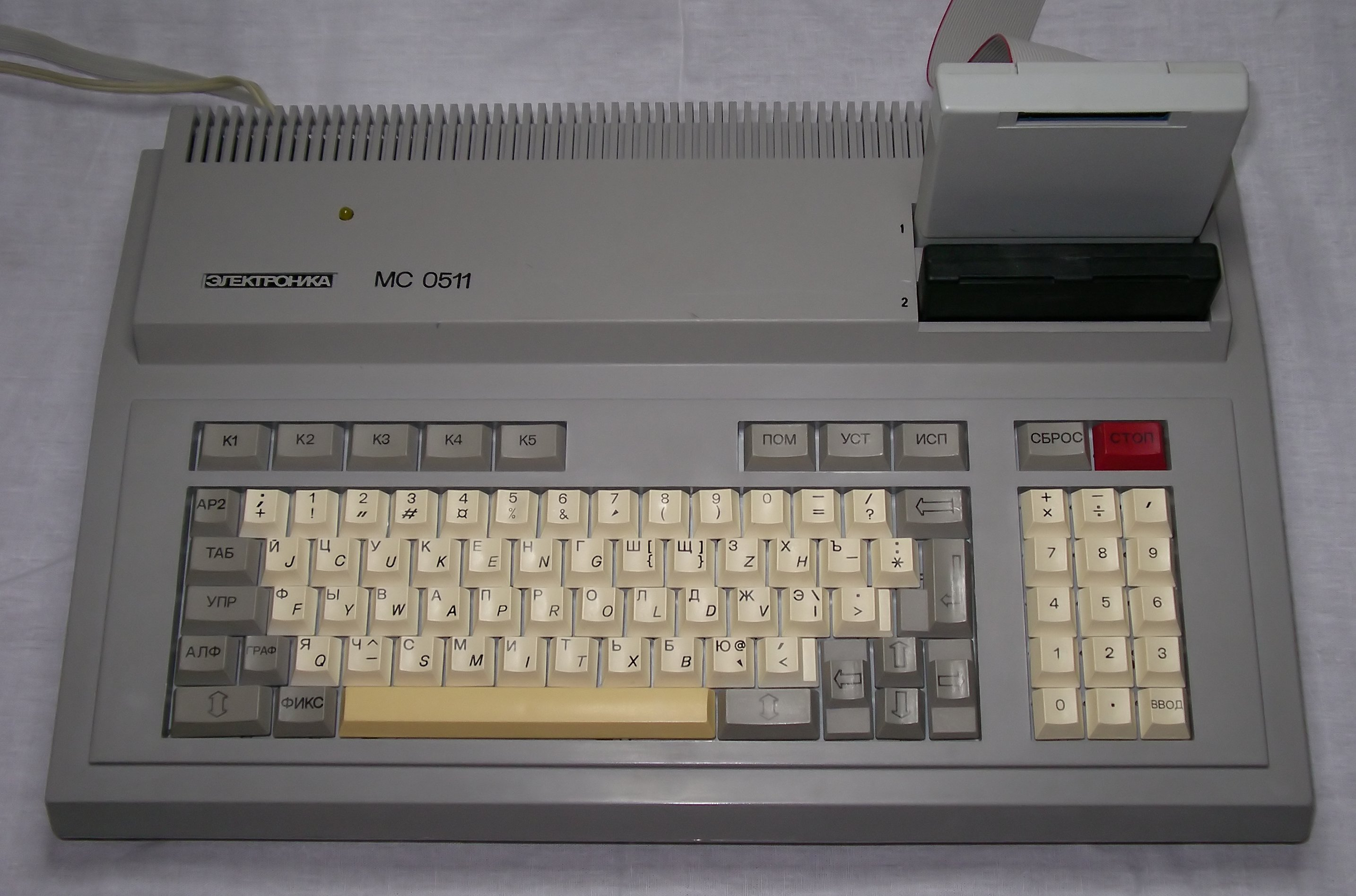
- UKNC (0511.2 variant)
- Also known as: Elektronika MS-0511
- Type: Study and research computer
- Released: 1987; 39 years ago
- Operating system: RAFOS, FODOS, RT-11
- CPU: 2 × KM1801VM2 @ 8 MHz
- Memory: RAM 192 KB, ROM 32 KB
- Storage: floppy disk 5 1/4"
- Graphics: max 640 × 288
- Input: Keyboard: 88 keys (MS-7007), JCUKEN layout
- Connectivity: built-in LAN controller

UKNC (Russian: УКНЦ) is a Soviet PDP-11-compatible educational micro computer, aimed at teaching school informatics courses. It is also known as Elektronika MS-0511. UKNC stands for Educational Computer by Scientific Centre. It was designed by the Scientific Centre in Zelenograd.

About 310,000 UKNC computers were produced, in five different factory complexes across the Soviet Union. Two were located in Russia, one in Šiauliai, Lithuania; one in Tbilisi, Georgia; and one in Chișinău, Moldova.

== Hardware ==
- Processor: KM1801VM2 1801 series CPU @ 8 MHz, 16 bit data bus, 17 bit address bus
- Peripheral processor: KM1801VM2 @ 6.25 MHz
- CPU RAM: 64 KiB
- PPU RAM: 32 KiB
- ROM: 32 KiB
- Video RAM: 96 KiB (3 planes 32 KiB each, each 3-bit pixel had a bit in each plane)
- Graphics: max 640 × 288 with 8 colors in one line (16 or 53 colors on whole screen), it is possible to set an individual palette, resolution (80, 160, 320, or 640 dots per line) and memory address for each of 288 screen lines; no text mode.
- Keyboard: 88 keys (MS-7007), JCUKEN layout
- Built-in LAN controller
- Built-in controller for common or special tape-recorder with computer control (to use for data storage, usually 5-inch FDD's were used)

One unique part of the design is the usage of a peripheral processing unit (PPU). Management of peripheral devices (display, audio, and so on) was offloaded to the PPU, which can also run user programs.

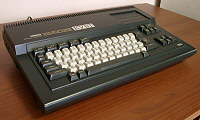
Yamaha YIS503II MSX Personal Computer designed for Soviet schools

The design of the case, the layout of the keyboard, the location and the shape of expansion slots are inspired by the Yamaha MSX system, which was purchased by the Soviet Union in the early 1980s for use in schools. The same case, with changed markings, is found with the IBM PC clone called Elektronika MS-1502. The same case and keyboard are found on another educational computer called Rusich (i8085 based).

The computer was released in 3 sub-models: 0511, 0511.1, 0511.2.

The 0511.1 model, intended for home use, has a power supply for 220 V AC, while others use 42 V AC.

The 0511.2 features new firmware with extended functionality and changed the marking of the keyboard's gray keys, compared to the initial version. There is no active cooling, and at least the 0511.2 variant tends to overheat and halt after several hours of operation.

== Software ==
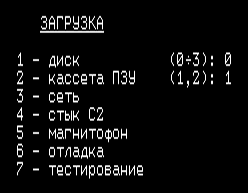
Boot menu of an educational computer UKNC. The screenshot was taken with the emulator UKNCBTL.

- Operating system: RAFOS, FODOS (RT-11 clones), or RT-11SJ/FB
- LAN control program
- Programming languages:
  - BASIC (Vilnius BASIC)
  - Fortran
  - Pascal
  - Modula-2
  - C
  - Assembler
  - Rapira
  - E-practicum
  - Logo
  - Prolog
  - Forth
  - FOCAL

== See also ==
- DVK
- Elektronika BK-0010
- SM EVM
