= Angstrem (company) =

Electronics company

Coordinates: 55°58′56″N 37°12′50″E

JSC «Angstrem»
- Native name: АО «Ангстрем»
- Company type: Open Joint Stock Company
- Industry: Electronics
- Founded: 1963
- Headquarters: Zelenograd, Moscow, Russia
- Key people: Sergey Vorontsov (General Director)
- Products: Integrated circuits
- Revenue: 1,691,979,000 Russian ruble (1,691,979,000 Russian ruble)
- Operating income: −437,651,000 Russian ruble (−437,651,000 Russian ruble)
- Net income
- Number of employees: 1571 (2011)
- Parent: Ruselectronics (Rostec)
- Website: https://www.angstrem.ru/

Angstrem JSC (Russian: АО Ангстрем) is a Moscow-based company involved in the design and fabrication of electronic products and semiconductors. It produced a range of Soviet-era integrated circuits. After the fall of the Soviet Union in the 1990s it has produced a line of calculators and bank cards.

== History ==
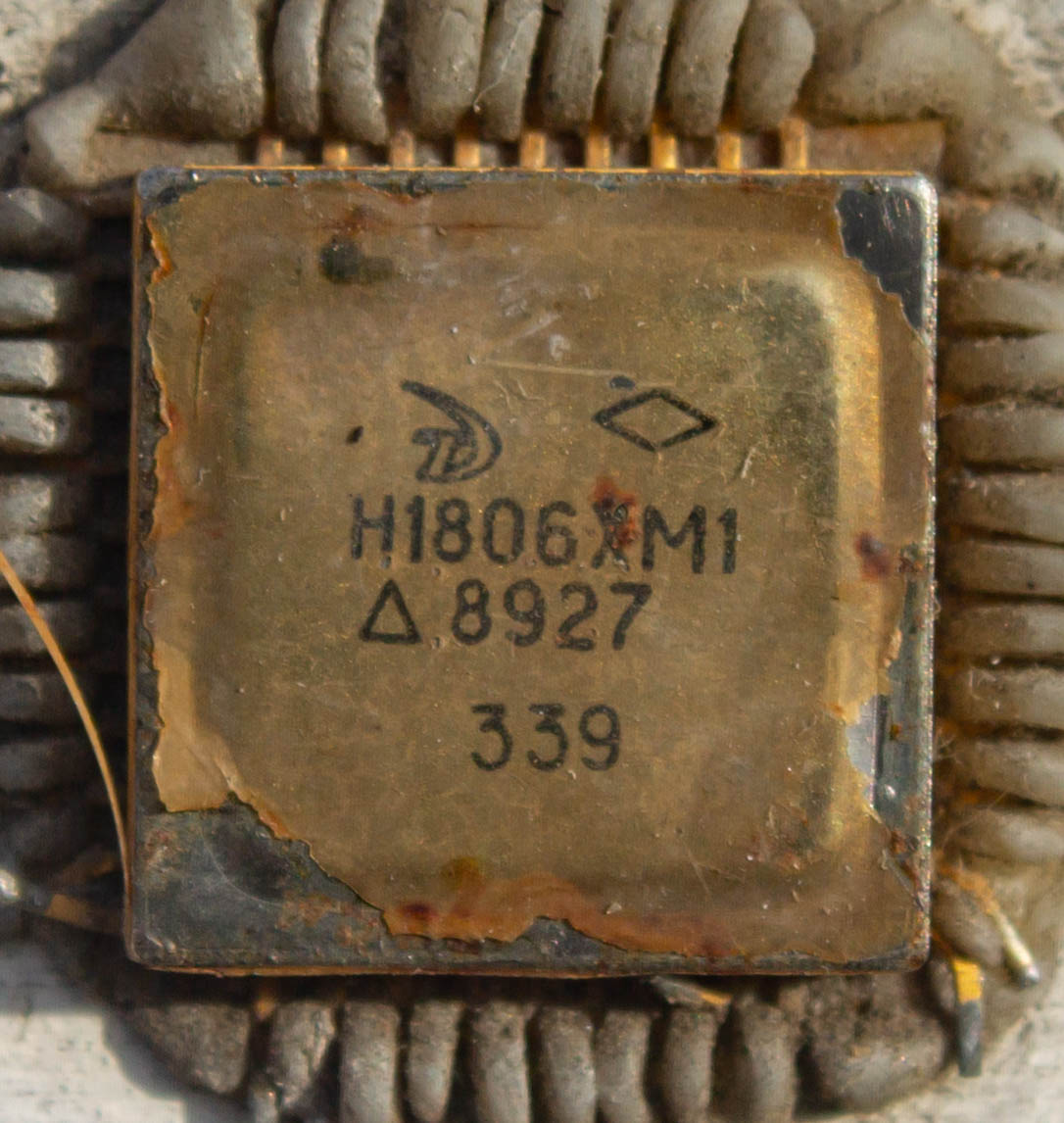
A military-purpose chip N1806KhM1 (Russian: Н1806ХМ1) of 1806 series made by Angstrem in the mid of 1989 (27th week of 1989). It's based on CMOS gate array technology and included up to 1500 transistors. The naming follows Soviet Union IC designation standard.

=== Soviet Union ===
Angstrem was founded on June 25, 1963, as NII-336 (Research Institute-336). It was later reorganized into the Research Institute of Fine Technology (Russian: НИИ точной технологии, NII tochnoy tekhnologii, NIITT) and Angstrem Factory as part of Scientific Production Association Science Center.

The company, along with Mikron (Moscow, Zelenograd) and Integral (Belarus, Minsk), was the main manufacturer of integrated circuits in the Soviet Union.

In 1981 Angstrem was awarded the Order of the October Revolution. Up until 1991 the company was subject to Ministry of the Electronics Industry, USSR.

=== Russia ===
In 1993 NIITT and Angstrem Factory were privatized as a single company, Angstrem.

Sergei Veremeyenko acquired control of the three companies in 2004. In June 2008, these companies were transferred to a management company OOO Group Angstrem.

In 2008 Angstrem JSC partnered (formed a corporate group) with an Angstrem-T company and promised to pay its debt of a loan given by a Russian state bank VEB.RF if the latter fails to pay it.

In early 2009, 50 percent of the shares of Angstrem and JSC Angstrem-M owned JSC Coal Trade and JSC Finance Contract Group were controlled by Sergei Veremeyenko. 25 percent belonged, through the Ruselectronics holding company, to the State Corporation Rostec and the Russian Federation. 11 percent were owned by the concern Sitronics, and 14 percent by minority shareholders.

In August 2009, it was reported that Veremeyenko planned to transfer its stake in OAO Angstrem, JSC Angstrem-M, Renaissance Capital, Federal Property Management Agency and Management Angstrem in exchange for a promissory note debt, which is estimated at 200 million rubles.

In June 2012, JSC Russian Electronics increased its stake in OAO Angstrem up to 31 percent.

By 2014 it reportedly adopted an insulated-gate bipolar transistor technology.

In 2017 however the Angstrem-T was hit hard by American sanctions and filled for bankruptcy. In 2018 the VEB.RF became a primary owner of the Angstrem-T and started to sell its equipment. It was reported that by the time of bankruptcy the Angstrem-T didn't reach 250 nm node process.

In 2021 Russia adopted a microelectronics development strategy for the period up to 2030, which involves the creation of Russian silicon factories with production standards of 28 nm, 12-14 nm and even 5-7 nm, operating according to the Foundry production business model.

In May 2023 the management of NPO Angstrem was transferred from L. Reiman's company to the Rostec structure; the decision does not provide for the seizure of assets.

== Angstrem-T ==
In early 2007 it was widely speculated that AMD (now GlobalFoundries) was planning to sell its old 130 nm-process equipment from an unnamed plant located in Dresden, Germany to Angstrem-T, a company in Angstrem JSC corporate group, in order to speed up its upgrade to 300mm wafers.

In 2008 the Angstrem-T, entered a joint venture with the German company M+W Zander (Exyte) to build a semiconductor plant in Zelenograd, Russia. It was intended to produce ICs designed for the production of integrated circuits with topological node size of 130 nm (200mm wafers). Total investment in the construction of this plant amounted to about $100 million and additional ~$100–130 million was invested in the company later, with a significant share going for a clean room. 6000 square meters of production facilities were built. The fab was provided with a central heating, electricity generation, and cooling system running on natural gas.

In 2018 due to Ukraine-related US sanctions economically struggling and unable to pay its debt, Angstrem-T went bankrupt and was taken over by its primary creditor VEB.RF bank. In 2020 the latter sued Angstrem JSC for partial damages as it was in surety of the loan given earlier to Angstrem-T by VEB.RF (2008). At the time, the company was owned by Leonid Reiman, a Russian ex-minister. VEB.RF has acquired all Angstrem-T equipment via its subsidiary company called NM-Tech (Russian: «НМ-Тех») in mid 2021 that further has been contrated to produce banking cards for Mir (payment system).

According to one report the bankruptcy revealed that at the time the Angstrem-T was only able to reach 250 nm node process. It's also speculated that 3-year-long delivery delay of photolithography equipment (90-130 nm node) bought from AMD in 2009 has contributed to the company's insolvency.

On February 22, 2022, in response to the recognition of Ukrainian break-away regions in Donetsk and Luhansk by Vladimir Putin, president of Russia, the U.S. Department of the Treasury has imposed sanctions on JSC Angstrem-T company freezing its assets and prohibiting individuals and entities in the United States' jurisdiction from doing businesses with it.

== Products ==
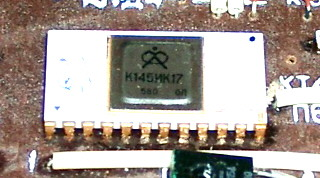
Integrated circuit K145IK17 (manufactured 1980, bearing Angstrem's old logo)

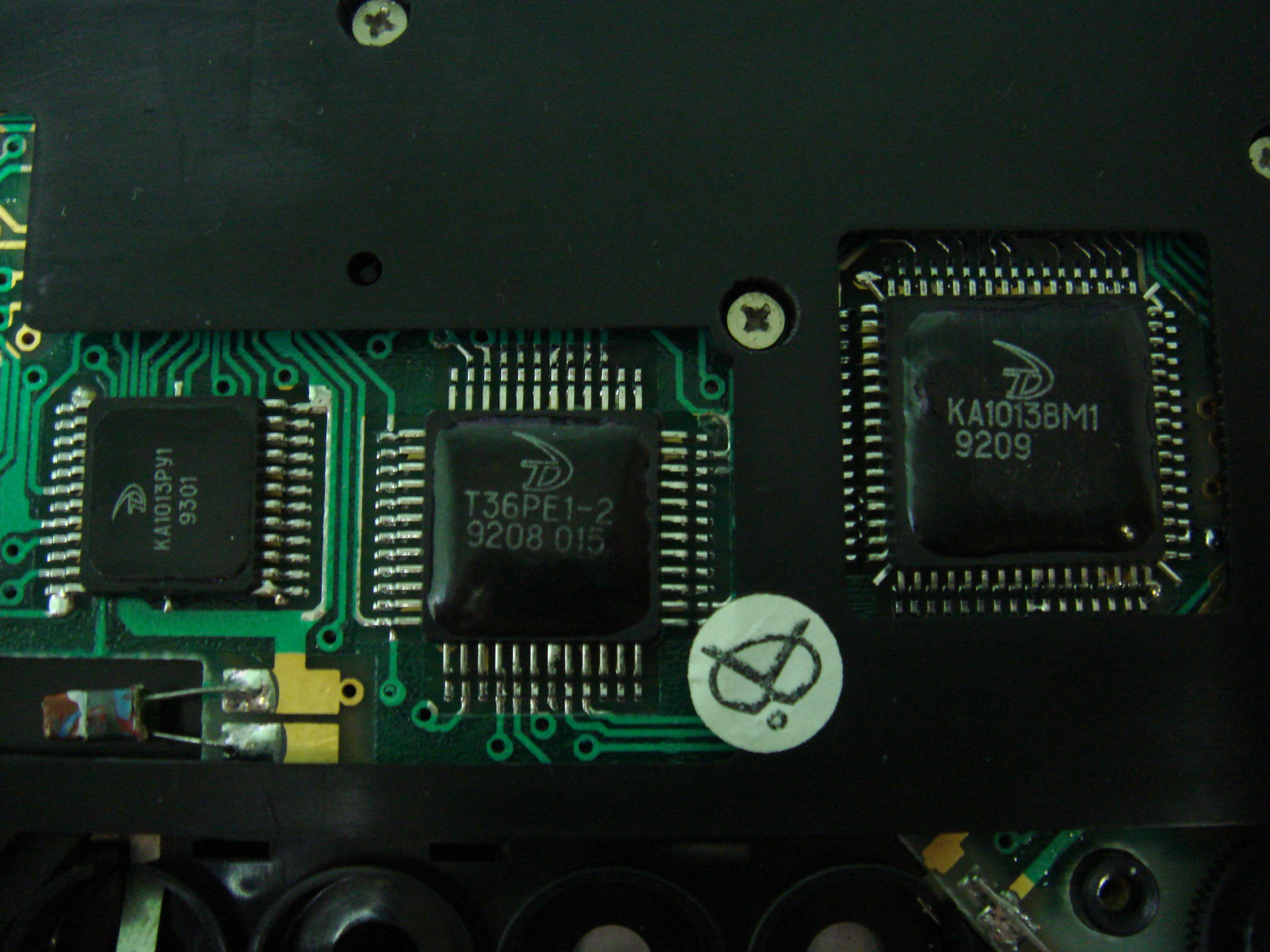
1013 series integrated circuits (manufactured 1992/1993, bearing Angstrem's newer "Hammer and sickle" logo) in an "Elektronika MK85" calculator (also from Angstrem)

- 1013, 1801, 1806, and 1836 series of CPUs (PDP-11 instruction set)
- 1830 series 8-bit microcontroller (MCS-51 instruction set)
- 1839 series CPU (VAX instruction set)
- 1867 series 16-bit DSP (Texas Instruments TMS320 instruction set)
- 1871 series 4-bit microcontroller
- 1874 series 16-bit microcontroller (Intel MCS-96 instruction set)
- 1876 series CPU (MIPS32 instruction set)
- 1878 and 5004 series 8-bit RISC microcontrollers
- 1892VM11Ya CPU (MIPS32 instruction set; designed by ELVEES Multicore)
- 5023 series radiation-hardened CPU (ARM instruction set)

== See also ==
- 7400 series – Second sources in Europe and the Eastern Bloc
- Soviet integrated circuit designation
