= ELVEES Multicore =

Series of microprocessors

General information
- Launched: 2004; 21 years ago
- Designed by: ELVEES

Performance
- Max. CPU clock rate: 80 MHz to 1.5 GHz

Architecture and classification
- Technology node: 250 nm to 16 nm
- Instruction set: CPU MIPS32 + DSP ELcore

Physical specifications
- Cores: 0–8 processors + 0–16 DSP

Multicore (Russian: МУЛЬТИКОР) is a series of 32-bit microprocessors with embedded DSP cores developed by ELVEES, Russia. The microprocessor is a MIPS32 core (called RISCore32 by ELVEES; optionally with an FPU) or an ARM Cortex-A9 core. Some of the processors in the series are radiation hardened (rad-hard) for space applications.

== Overview ==
Device	Microprocessor core	DSP core	Production start (year)	Process (nm)	Clock rate (MHz)	Remarks
1892VM1T	RISCore32	1x ELcore	?	?	?	
1892VM1Ya	RISCore32	1x ELcore	?	?	?	
1892VM2Ya	RISCore32	1x ELcore-24	2005	250	80	
1892VM3T	RISCore32	1x ELcore-14	2005	250	80	
1892VM4Ya	RISCore32	2x ELcore-26	2006	250	100	
1892VM5Ya	RISCore32	2x ELcore-26	2006	250	100	
1892VM5BYa	RISCore32	2x ELcore-26	?	?	90	
1892VM7Ya	RISCore32 + FPU	4x ELcore-28	2009	130	200	
1892VM8Ya	RISCore32 + FPU	1x ELcore-26	2010	250	80	rad-hard
1892VM10Ya	RISCore32 + FPU	2x ELcore-30	2012	130	250	
1892VM11Ya	RISCore32 + FPU	2x ELcore-30	2011	65	500	
1892VM12AT	RISCore32 + FPU	—	2013	180	100	rad-hard
1892VM14Ya	2x ARM Cortex-A9 + GPU Mali-300	2x ELcore-30M	2014	40	816	
1892VM15AF	RISCore32 + FPU	2x ELcore-30M	2014	180	120	rad-hard
1892VM16T	RISCore32 + FPU	1x ELcore	2014	180	110	rad-hard
1892VM17F	RISCore32 + FPU	1x ELcore	2014	180	110	rad-hard
1892VM18F	RISCore32 + FPU	2x ELcore	2015	180	110	rad-hard
1892VM196	RISCore32 + FPU	—	2018	180	120	rad-hard
1892VM206	RISCore32 + FPU	2x ELcore-30M	2018	180	120	rad-hard
1892VM218	?	?	?	?	?	
1892VM226	?	?	2020 ?	?	?	rad-hard
1892VM236	?	?	2019	90	?	rad-hard
1892VM248	8x MIPS64 + PowerVR GPU	16x ELcore-50	2020 ?	16	1500	
1892VM258	?	?	?	?	?	
1892VM268	ARM Cortex-M33	?	2021 ?	?	?	
1892VA018	4x ARM Cortex-A53 + PowerVR GPU	2x ELcore-50	2020 ?	?	1200	
1892VK016	2x RISCore32	—	2019	180	100	rad-hard
1892VK024	RISCore32 + FPU	2x ELcore	2020 ?	180	?	rad-hard
1892KP1Ya	RISCore32	—	2010	?	100	rad-hard
1892KhD2Ya	RISCore32	—	2007	?	?	rad-hard

== Details ==
=== 1892VM1Ya ===
- Russian: 1892ВМ1Я
- CMOS process
- HSBGA292 package

=== 1892VM2Ya ===
- Russian: 1892ВМ2Я (MC-24)
- 2 cores: RISCore32 + ELcore-24 (DSP-core with SIMD architecture)
- manufactured in a 250 nm CMOS process
- 18 million transistors
- HSBGA292 package

=== 1892VM3T ===
- Russian: 1892ВМ3Т (MC-12)
- 2 cores: RISCore32 + ELcore-14 (DSP-core with SISD architecture)
- manufactured in a 250 nm CMOS process
- 18 million transistors
- PQFP240 package

=== 1892VM4Ya ===
- Russian: 1892ВМ4Я (MC-0226G, МЦОС)
- 3 cores: RISCore32 + 2x ELcore-26 (DSP-core with MIMD architecture)
- manufactured in a foundry outside Russia in a 250 nm CMOS process
- 26 million transistors
- HSBGA416 package
- includes 2 PCI controllers

=== 1892VM5Ya ===
- Russian: 1892ВМ5Я (МС-0226, ЦПОС-02)
- 3 cores: RISCore32 + 2x ELcore-26 (DSP-core with MIMD architecture)
- manufactured in a foundry outside Russia in a 250 nm CMOS process
- 26 million transistors
- HSBGA416 package
- includes 1 PCI controller

=== 1892VM7Ya ===
- Russian: 1892ВМ7Я (МС-0428)
- 130 nm CMOS process, 81 million transistors
- HSBGA765 package
- includes 2 SpaceWire ports

=== 1892VM8Ya ===
- Russian: 1892ВМ8Я (MC-24R)
- manufactured by X-Fab Malaysia in a 250 nm CMOS process and later by TSMC in a 40 nm CMOS process (with the clock speed increased to 100 MHz)
- HSBGA416 package
- includes 2 SpaceWire ports; supports ECC memory

=== 1892VM10Ya ===
- Russian: 1892ВМ10Я (NVCom-02T)
- manufactured in a foundry outside Russia in a 130 nm CMOS process
- does not contain any IP blocks from outside Russia
- 50 million transistors
- HSBGA400 package
- includes 24-channel correlator for GPS / GLONASS

=== 1892VM11Ya ===
- Russian: 1892ВМ11Я (NVCom-02)
- manufactured by Angstrem in a 65 nm CMOS process
- BGA586 package
- includes 24-channel correlator for GPS and GLONASS signals

=== 1892VM12AT ===
- Russian: 1892ВМ12АТ (MCT-03P)
- manufactured in Zelenograd in a 180 nm CMOS process
- does not contain any IP blocks from outside Russia
- CQFP240 package
- includes 2 SpaceWire ports; supports ECC memory
- radiation tolerance to not less than 300 kRad, working temperature from -60 to 85 °C

=== 1892VM14Ya ===
- Russian: 1892ВМ14Я (MCom-02)
- manufactured by TSMC in a 40 nm CMOS process
- HFCBGA 1296 package
- includes 2 SpaceWire ports; hardware accelerators for H.264 and JPEG encoding; correlator for GPS and GLONASS signals

=== 1892VM15AF ===
- Russian: 1892ВМ15АФ (MC-30SF6)
- manufactured in Zelenograd in a 180 nm CMOS process
- does not contain any IP blocks from outside Russia
- CPGA720 package
- includes 2 SpaceWire ports; supports ECC memory; hardware accelerators for FFT and JPEG encoding
- power consumption 5 W
- triple redundancy for registers; radiation tolerance to not less than 300 kRad, working temperature from -60 to 85 °C

=== 1892VM16T ===
- Russian: 1892ВМ16Т
- manufactured by Mikron Group in a 180 nm CMOS process
- CQFP240 package
- working temperature from -60 to 85 °C

=== 1892VM17F ===
- Russian: 1892ВМ17Ф
- manufactured by Mikron Group in a 180 nm CMOS process
- CPGA416 package
- working temperature from -60 to 85 °C

=== 1892VM18F ===
- Russian: 1892ВМ18Ф
- manufactured by Mikron Group in a 180 nm CMOS process
- CPGA720 package
- working temperature from -60 to 85 °C

=== 1892VM196 ===
- Russian: 1892ВМ196
- manufactured in Zelenograd in a 180 nm process
- does not contain any IP blocks from outside Russia
- CPGA416 package
- includes SpaceWire, ARINC 429, SPI, and CAN interfaces as well as a 12-bit, 100 kHz ADC

=== 1892VM206 ===
- Russian: 1892ВМ206
- manufactured in Zelenograd in a 180 nm process
- does not contain any IP blocks from outside Russia
- CPGA720 package
- includes SpaceWire, SpaceFibre, ARINC 429, AFDX, MIL-STD-1553, and CAN interfaces

=== 1892VM226 ===
- Russian: 1892ВМ226
- includes SpaceWire and SpaceFibre interfaces

=== 1892VM236 ===
- Russian: 1892ВМ236
- manufactured in Zelenograd in a 90 nm process
- includes SpaceWire interface

=== 1892VM248 ===
- Russian: 1892ВМ248 (RoboDeus)
- manufactured by TSMC in a 16 nm process
- intended for data centers and robotic systems
- MIPI CSI and DSI interfaces (4K / 60fps), hardware accelerators for H.264 and HEVC
- includes 10 Gigabit Ethernet, USB 3.1, HDMI, PCIe, and SATA interfaces

=== 1892VA018 ===
- Russian: 1892ВА018 (Scythian)
- intended for smart cameras, robotic systems, industrial automation
- MIPI CSI and DSI interfaces (4K / 60fps), hardware accelerators for H.264 and HEVC
- GNSS signal processor
- hardware accelerators for software-defined radios (FFT, Viterbi)
- includes Gigabit Ethernet and USB 3.0 interfaces

=== 1892VK016 ===
- Russian: 1892ВК016 (MCT-04R)
- manufactured in Russia in a 180 nm CMOS process
- CPGA720 package
- intended for SSD controllers; includes SpaceWire and SpaceFibre interfaces; ECC for internal and external memory
- radiation tolerance to not less than 200 kRad, working temperature from -60 to 85 °C

=== 1892VK024 ===
- Russian: 1892ВК024 (MCT-07R)
- manufactured in a 180 nm CMOS process
- includes SpaceFibre, MIL-STD-1553, and I²C interfaces as well as an 8-channel, 12-bit 200 kHz ADC

=== 1892KP1Ya ===
- Russian: 1892КП1Я (MCK-022)
- manufactured in a CMOS process
- HSBGA-416 package
- includes 16-port SpaceWire router
- working temperature from -60 to 85 °C

=== 1892KhD2Ya ===
- Russian: 1892ХД2Я (MCK-01)
- manufactured in a CMOS process
- HSBGA-416 package
- includes 16-port SpaceWire router

== See also ==
- Soviet integrated circuit designation
