= Texas Instruments SBP0400 =

Microprogrammable 4-bit slice processor

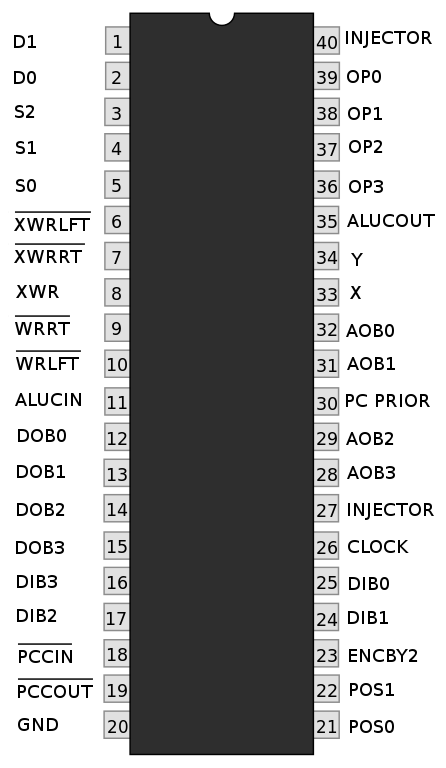
SBP0400 pin-out

The Texas Instruments SBP0400 (SBP = silicon bipolar), also known as SBC 0400 and X0400, is a microprogrammable 4-bit slice processor that was introduced in 1976 (delivery began in December 1975). It was one of the first LSI processors and was the first device in the USA based on I²L technology (integrated injection logic). It was used for research and teaching purposes in the aerospace industry (NASA) and in the learning computer LCM-1001 (Texas Instruments, 1976). This microprocessor learning computer was probably the company's first.

== Technical data ==
- technology: I²L (I/O pins are TTL compatible)
- number of gates: 1616
- gates per square millimeter: 81
- clock frequency: 1 MHz, up to 5 MHz
- arithmetic logic unit (ALU) with 16 operations, functionally similar to the 74181
- ten 4-bit registers: working register (accumulator), extended working register, 8 general registers, of which register 7 has a separate incrementer (intended as the program counter)
- 9-bit microinstructions which are mapped through a mask-programmable PLA to a 20-bit internal control word, which is stored in the 20-bit operations register in order to allow microinstruction pipelining
- the default PLA implements 459 unique microinstructions (out of 512 microinstructions possible for 9 bits)
- cascadable to form an 8/12/16-bit processor
- parallel access to control functions, data-in, data-out, and address-out
- 40-pin DIP (dual in-line package)
- minimum supply voltage: 0,4 V

== Teaching computer LCM-1001 ==
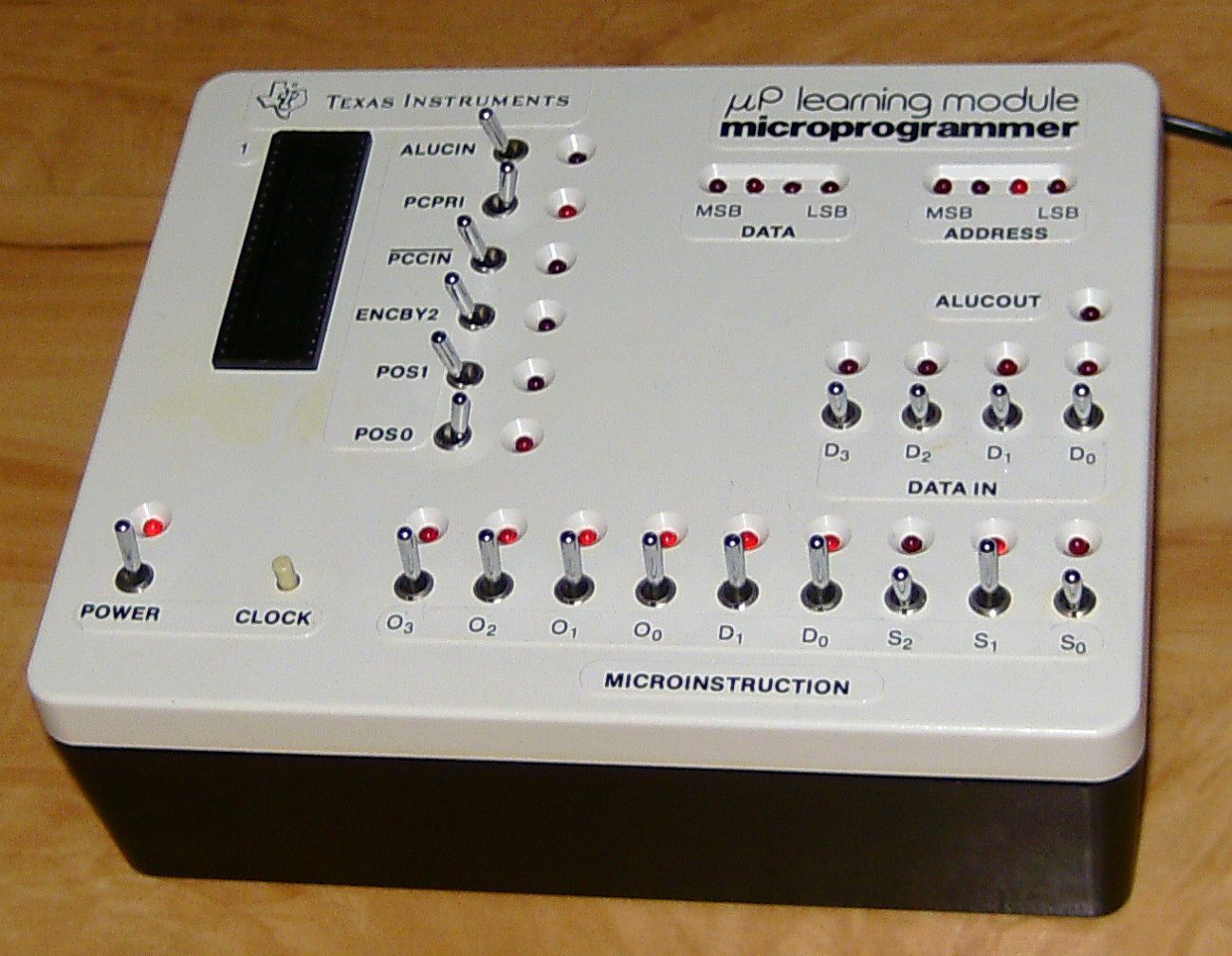
Teaching computer LCM-1001 with SBP0400 CPU inside

In addition to the SBP0400, the learning computer contains a 74279 latch and a rechargeable battery. It is powered by a 7 V power supply unit. It is operated via a total of 20 toggle switches, which are divided into nine micro-operation switches, four data input switches, six control switches and the main switch. The switch position "down" or "left" corresponds to digital "0" or LOW; the position "up" or "right" corresponds to "1" or HIGH. The switch position at "1" is additionally indicated by a red LED lighting up. Nine further LEDs are used as output, four each for data and address, and one for ALUCOUT (ALU carry-out).

The commands are entered bit by bit, whereby the 9-bit microinstruction word is divided into four ALU command bits, two target operand and three source operand bits. The least significant bit position (LSB) within each of the three groups is on the right. After each data input or expected output, the "CLOCK" push-button must be pressed to write the command to the command register and increase the command counter. Depending on the command used, the input is then made via the four data switches.

The control switches are: ALUCIN (ripple-carry in), PCPRI (program counter priority, required to turn on the output LEDs on the address bus, PCCIN (program counter carry-in), ENCBY2 (enable program counter increment by a displacement of 1 or 2), POS1, POS0 (most significant, intermediate, or least significant position of the processor slice in a cascade).

A DIL-40 socket serves as an optional extension by three further modules of the LCM-1000 series or own modules. The pin assignment is identical to that of the SBP0400 (power supply at the second INJECTOR pin - pin 40).

- LCM-1001 base device ($149,95)
- LCM-1002 controller module for micro programming with 256×20 bit PROM ($189,95)
- LCM-1003 memory module containing 1024 12-bit words ($189,95)
- LCM-1004 input/output module ($109,95)

== Prototype, successors, and clones ==
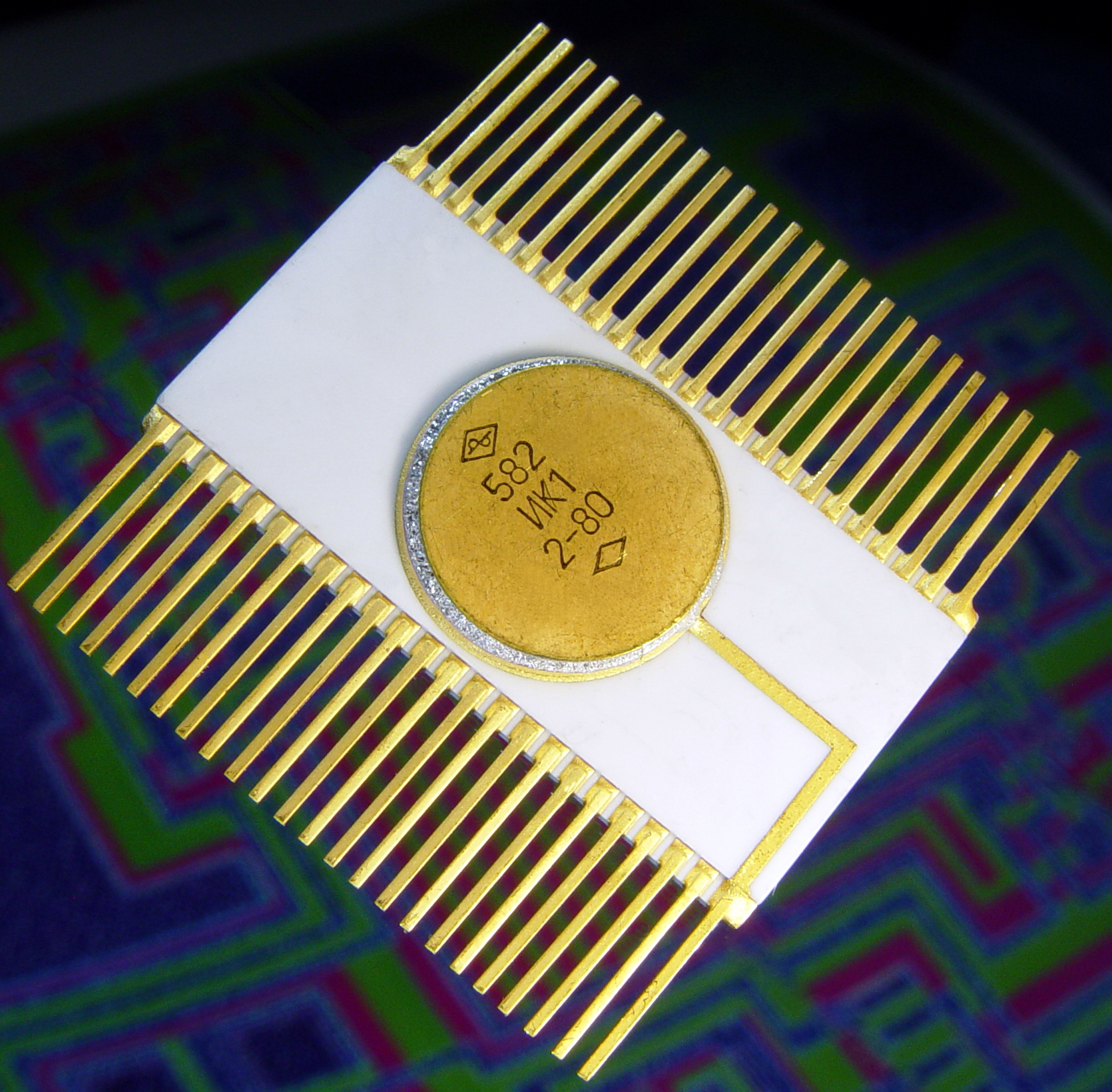
Soviet clone chip

The prototype was given the designation X0400.

Another circuit family member is the SBP0401 without the operations register and with an asynchronous operation decoder.

Successors from TI were the 4-bit-slice 74S481 and 8-bit-slice SN74AS888. The 74S481 was used to implement TI's 990/12 minicomputer, where it combined ROM with writable control store.

The former Soviet Union manufactured an SBP0400 Clone, the K582IK2 (К582ИК2).

== Sources ==
=== Literature ===
- LCM-1001 handbook
- Wester, John G.; Simpson, William D. (1976). Software Design for Microprocessors. Texas Instruments. Bibcode:1976sdm..book.....W. (mirror: Wester, John G.; Simpson, William D. (1976). Software Design for Microprocessors. Bibcode:1976sdm..book.....W.; Wester, John G.; Simpson, William D. (1976). Software Design for Microprocessors. Bibcode:1976sdm..book.....W. )
- The Bipolar Microcomputer Components Data Book. Texas Instruments. 1977.
