= Kombinat Mikroelektronik Erfurt =

Manufacturer of active electronic components in East Germany

- Type: VEB
- Industry: Active electronic components
- Founded: January 1, 1978
- Defunct: June 28, 1990
- Headquarters: Erfurt, Germany

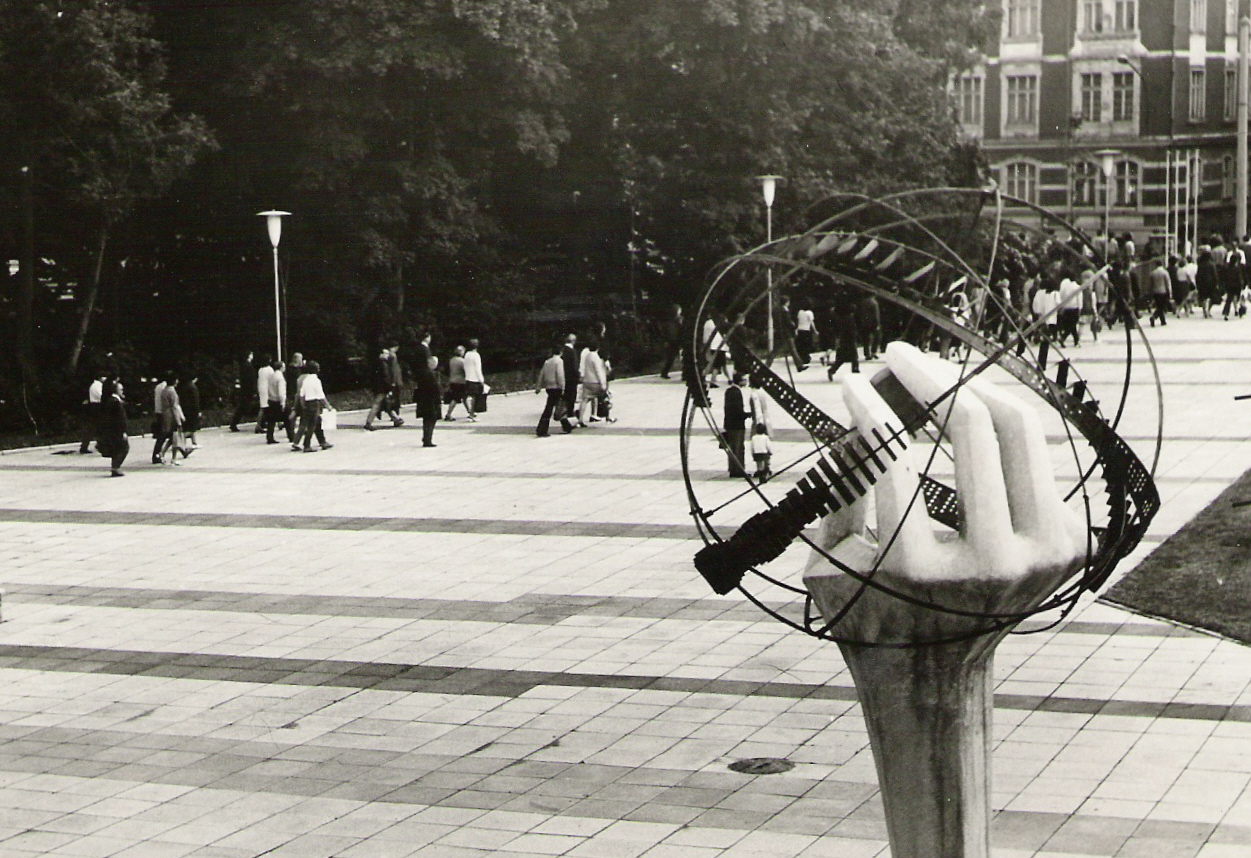
Sculpture "Hand with chip" at the entrance of VEB Mikroelektronik "Karl Marx" Erfurt

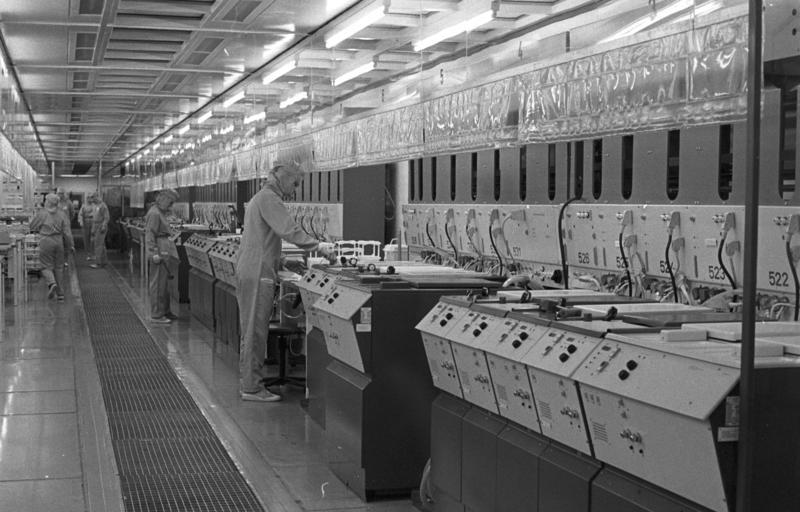
Cleanroom at VEB Mikroelektronik "Karl Marx" Erfurt (1989)

VEB Kombinat Mikroelektronik Erfurt was an important manufacturer of active electronic components in East Germany. It should not be confused with the more well-known VEB Kombinat Robotron Dresden which used integrated circuits from Kombinat Mikroelektronik in its computers.

Their products often carried the trademark RFT, but this was used on most electronic products from East Germany from otherwise unrelated companies.

== History ==
The Kombinat Mikroelektronik Erfurt was formed in 1978 when the VVB Bauelemente und Vakuumtechnik was split into VEB Kombinat Elektronische Bauelemente Teltow for passive electronic components and VEB Kombinat Mikroelektronik Erfurt for active electronic components. However, the history of many of the individual plants reaches back further, in some cases to before the Second World War. In 1971 the first integrated circuits had been manufactured — the D100C (TTL) by Halbleiterwerk Frankfurt (Oder) and the U101D (PMOS logic) by Funkwerk Erfurt. To put this into perspective, the first TTL circuits went into production in the US 10 years and at Siemens in West Germany 5 years before East Germany. The first microprocessor, the U808D, followed in 1978, 6 years after the Intel 8008 that the U808 was cloned from. Further milestones were the U880 (Zilog Z80 clone) in 1980 and the first 16-bit microprocessor U8000 (Zilog Z8000 clone) in 1984. The ruling Socialist Unity Party of Germany had identified the development of the microelectronics sector as a primary goal. Huge sums were spent in order to catch up to the West — between 1986 and 1990 about 7% of the country-wide industry investment. However, this effort was hampered by several factors: the general inefficiency of the planned economy, insufficient cooperation with other Comecon countries, and western CoCom export restrictions that prevented the importation of semiconductor manufacturing equipment. Nonetheless, the development program achieved samples of a 1Mbit dRAM chip (U61000) in 1988 and a 32-bit processor (U80701) in 1989. Mikroelektronik "Karl Marx" Erfurt achieved a feature size of 3 μm on 4-inch wafers in 1984 (plant ESO I), 2.5 μm in 1988 (plant ESO II), and 1.5 μm on 5-inch wafers in 1990 (plant ESO III). In 1989, Halbleiterwerk Frankfurt (Oder) produced 110 million integrated circuits and Mikroelektronik "Karl Marx" Erfurt produced 35 million.

=== After 1990 ===
Following the German reunification, Kombinat Mikroelektronik was dissolved and operated for a time as a holding company under the name PTC-electronic AG which was 100% owned by the Treuhandanstalt. Most products from Kombinat Mikroelektronik could not be sold on the world market and many plants were liquidated by the Treuhandanstalt in 1991.

The Thesys Gesellschaft für Mikroelektronik mbH and the X-FAB Gesellschaft zur Fertigung von Wafern mbH were created in 1992 from parts of VEB Mikroelektronik "Karl Marx" Erfurt (which had operated under the name ERMIC GmbH from 1990 until 1992). In 1999 both companies were combined as X-FAB Semiconductor Foundries GmbH. In 2007, X-FAB took over another former part of Kombinat Mikroelektronik: the foundry of the former VEB ZFTM Dresden. ZFTM Dresden had become Zentrum Mikroelektronik Dresden GmbH (ZMD) in 1993. After several ownership changes and the sale of the foundry to X-FAB, ZMD was renamed to ZMDI and the remaining fab-less design house was ultimately sold to Integrated Device Technology in 2015. Not far from Dresden in Freiberg, the wafer production of VEB Spurenmetalle continued through Siltronic and Freiberger Compound Materials GmbH. Together with TU Dresden, VEB ZFTM and VEB Spurenmetalle formed the foundation for Silicon Saxony, a cluster of microelectronics companies that came to include new fabs by Siemens (later Infineon Technologies) and AMD (later GlobalFoundries).

The Frankfurt (Oder) region did not fare as well. VEB Halbleiterwerk was succeeded, in turn, by Halbleiterwerk GmbH, System Microelectronic Innovation GmbH (SMI), Silicon Microelectronic Integration GmbH (SiMI), Megaxess GmbH Deutschland, and Microtechnology Services Frankfurt (Oder) GmbH (MSF), each with less employees than its predecessor. The website of MSF disappeared around 2009. Construction on a new semiconductor plant, Communicant Semiconductor Technologies, had started already but this endeavour collapsed in 2003. Only IHP, the research institute that had supported VEB Halbleiterwerk, remained after that.

At VEB Werk für Fernsehelektronik Berlin, the production of electronic tubes and optoelectronics was shut down step by step until only the relatively modern manufacturing of colour CRTs remained. In 1993 the CRT manufacturing was taken over by Samsung SDI. In 2005, when LCD screens largely replaced CRTs, the plant was shut down entirely.

VEB Mikroelektronik "Karl Liebknecht" Stahnsdorf became Leistungselektronik Stahnsdorf AG (LES AG) which was liquidated by the Treuhandanstalt in 1992. The semiconductor manufacturing was sold to Indian investors and continued under the name Lesag HBB. When the investors withdrew in the middle of the 1990s, the number of employees had fallen from 3000 in 1989 to 79. In 1996, several former employees founded SeCoS Halbleitertechnologie GmbH to continue semiconductor manufacturing in Stahnsdort. By 2001, the patents and rights of SeCoS were transferred to SeCoS Corporation in Taiwan. Only the small group developing silicon pressure sensors survived in Stahnsdorf and was acquired by Endress+Hauser.

In Neuhaus am Rennweg, the SMD packaging of VEB Mikroelektronik "Anna Seghers" became part of Zetex Semiconductors which was in turn acquired by Diodes Incorporated.

== Divisions ==
The Kombinat consisted of a number of plants across East Germany (listed with their production profile in 1989):

- VEB Mikroelektronik "Karl Marx" Erfurt (MME), before 1983 Funkwerk Erfurt (FWE) — Kombinat headquarters; NMOS and CMOS digital integrated circuits
- VEB Halbleiterwerk Frankfurt (Oder) (HFO) — bipolar analogue and digital integrated circuits, mixed-signal integrated circuits, CMOS integrated circuits, low-power bipolar junction transistors
- VEB Mikroelektronik "Anna Seghers" Neuhaus am Rennweg, before 1981 Röhrenwerk Neuhaus am Rennweg (RWN) — bipolar junction transistors
- VEB Mikroelektronik "Karl Liebknecht" Stahnsdorf (MLS), before 1981 Gleichrichterwerk Stahnsdorf (GWS) — power semiconductor devices (silicon rectifier diodes, bipolar junction transistors), pressure sensors
- VEB Mikroelektronik "Robert Harnau" Großräschen, former Gleichrichterwerk Großräschen — selenium rectifiers and silicon rectifier diodes
- VEB Werk für Fernsehelektronik Berlin (WF) — CRTs, LEDs, LCDs, optoelectronics
- VEB Mikroelektronik "Wilhelm Pieck" Mühlhausen (MPM), before 1982 Röhrenwerk Mühlhausen — low-power diodes (including Zener diodes); also KC85 series home computers, pocket calculators
- VEB Röhrenwerk Rudolstadt, before 1961 Phönix Röntgenröhrenwerk Rudolstadt — X-ray tubes
- VEB Applikationszentrum Elektronik Berlin (AEB) — import of electronic components, documentation, application support
- VEB Mikroelektronik "Friedrich Engels" Ilmenau, before 1983 Elektroglas Ilmenau — semiconductor packages
- VEB Mikroelektronik Secura-Werke Berlin — components for CRTs; also photocopiers
- VEB Mikroelektronik "Bruno Baum" Zehdenick, before 1977 Isolierwerk Zehdenick — punched parts, insulating materials
- VEB Spurenmetalle Freiberg — silicon and gallium arsenide wafers
- VEB Glaskolbenwerk Weißwasser — glass envelopes for CRTs

Two plants from Kombinat Mikroelektronik were moved to VEB Kombinat "Carl Zeiss" Jena in 1986:

- VEB Zentrum für Forschung und Technologie Mikroelektronik Dresden (ZFTM) — development and pilot production of integrated circuits
- VEB Hochvakuum Dresden — equipment for physical vapor deposition

The East German clock and watch industry formed part of the Kombinat Mikroelektronik as the Leitbereich Uhren (Clock Directorate) with a number of plants:

- VEB Uhrenwerke Ruhla — also CMOS integrated circuits, primarily for watches and clocks
- VEB Uhrenwerk Glashütte
- VEB Uhrenwerk Weimar
- VEB Plastverarbeitung Eisenach
- VEB Feinwerktechnik Dresden

== Products ==
=== Microprocessors ===
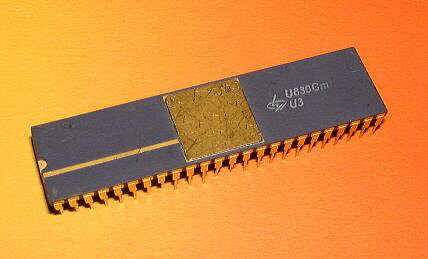
U830Cm (VEB ZFTM Dresden, 1986)

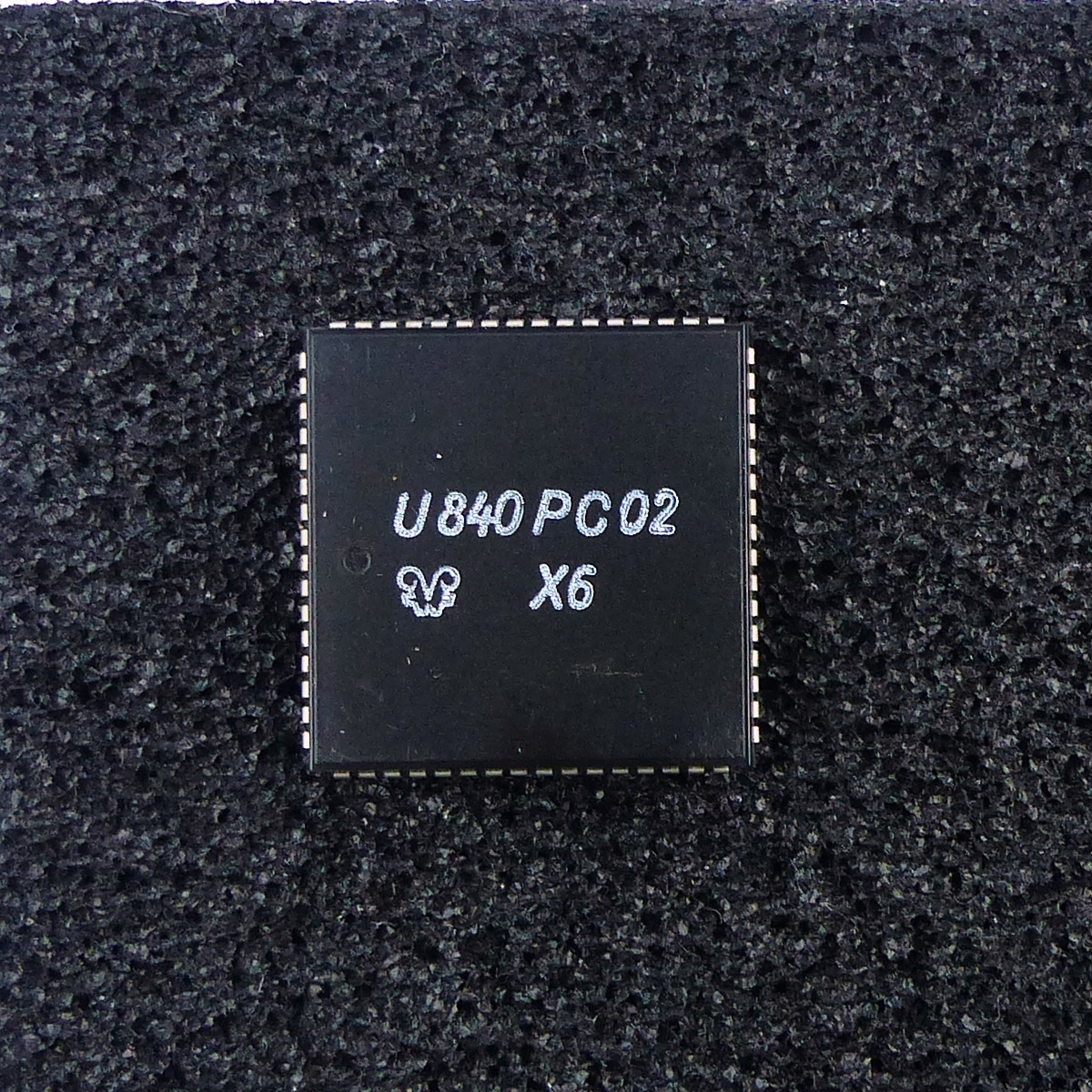
U840PC02 (VEB Mikroelektronik "Karl Marx" Erfurt, 1989)

The U830, U8032, U8047, and U320C20 were manufactured by ZFTM Dresden while all other processors came from Mikroelektronik "Karl Marx" Erfurt.

- U808 — 8-bit microprocessor, clone of the Intel 8008
- U830 — asynchronous 8-bit processor slice for PDP-11 compatible computers, no international equivalent
- U8032 — 16-bit arithmetic coprocessor slice, no international equivalent
- U840 – microcontroller for boolean bit processing, no international equivalent
- U880 — 8-bit microprocessor, clone of the Zilog Z80
- U881 through U886 — 8-bit microcontrollers, clones of the Zilog Z8
- U8000 — 16-bit microprocessors, clones of the Zilog Z8000
- U8047 — 4-bit microcontroller
- U84C00 — 8-bit microprocessor, CMOS version of the Zilog Z80, pilot production only
- U80601 — 16-bit microprocessor, clone of the Intel 80286, pilot production only
- U80701 — 32-bit microprocessor, clone of the MicroVAX 78032, pilot production only
- U320C20 — 16-bit digital signal processor, CMOS version of the Texas Instruments TMS32020, pilot production only

=== Other components ===
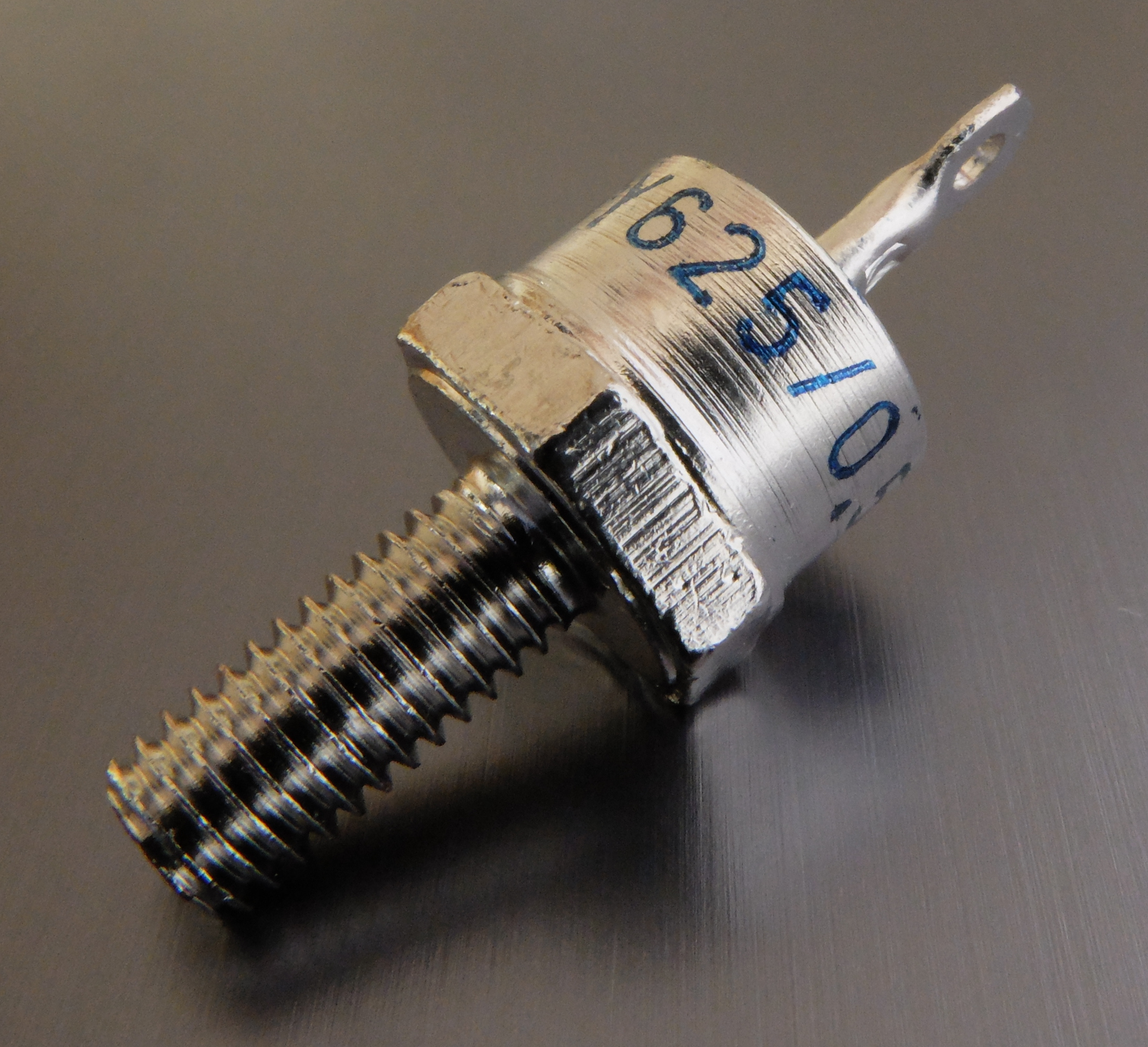
Rectifier diode SY625/0,5 (VEB Mikroelektronik "Robert Harnau" Großräschen, 1990)

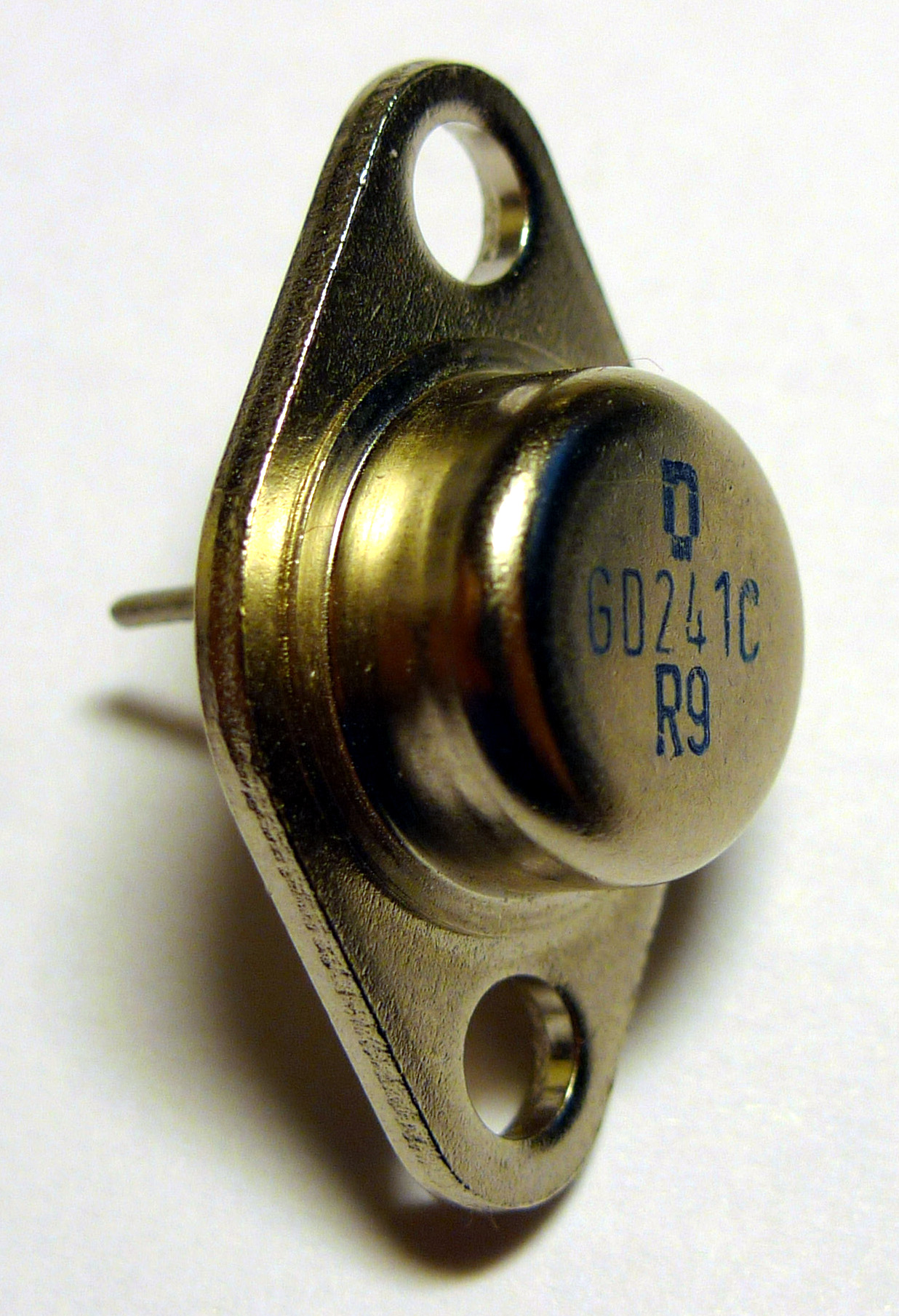
Germanium power transistor GD241 (VEB Mikroelektronik "Anna Seghers" Neuhaus am Rennweg, 1983)

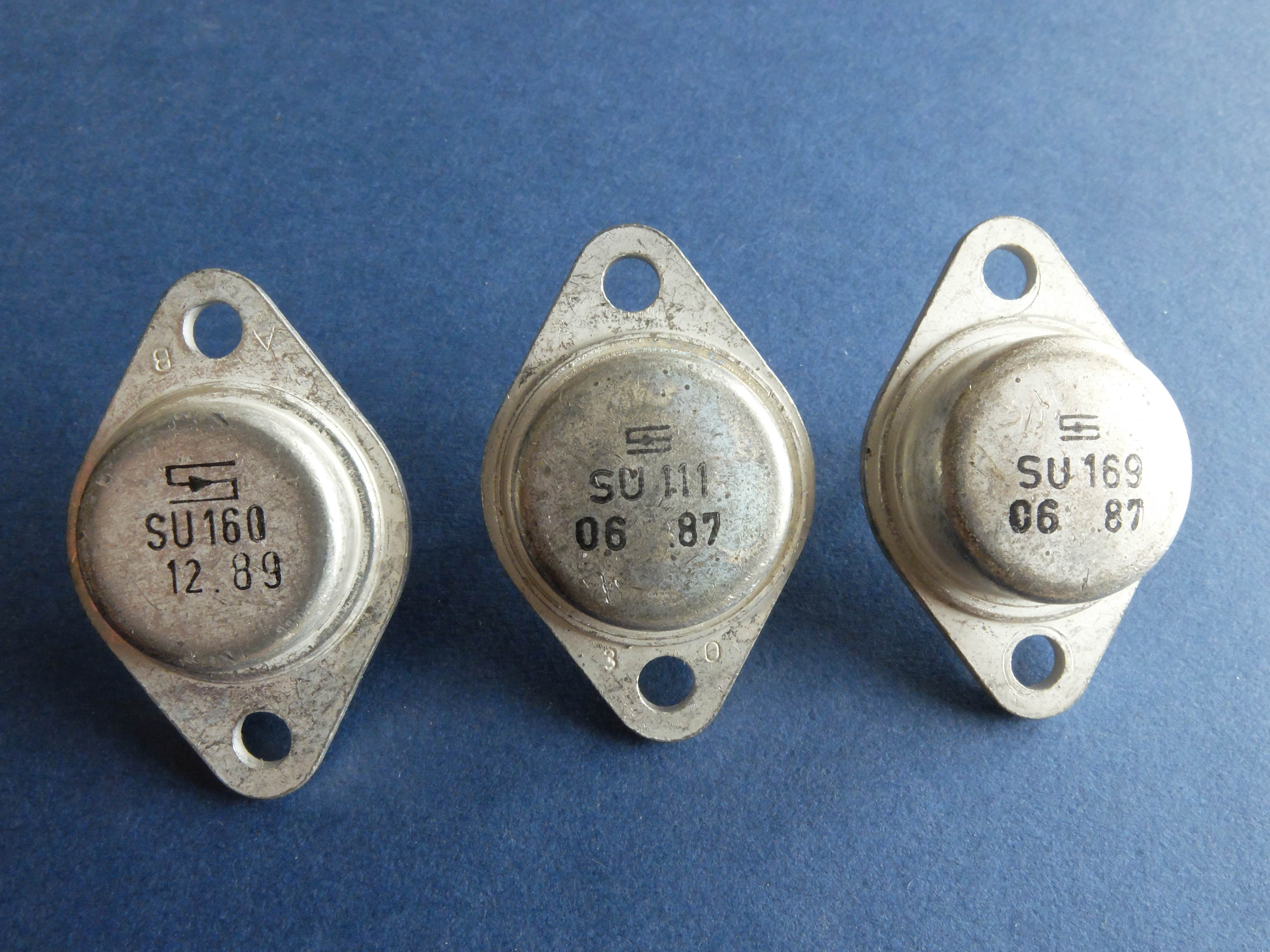
Silicon power transistors (VEB Mikroelektronik "Karl Liebknecht" Stahnsdorf, 1987 - 1989)

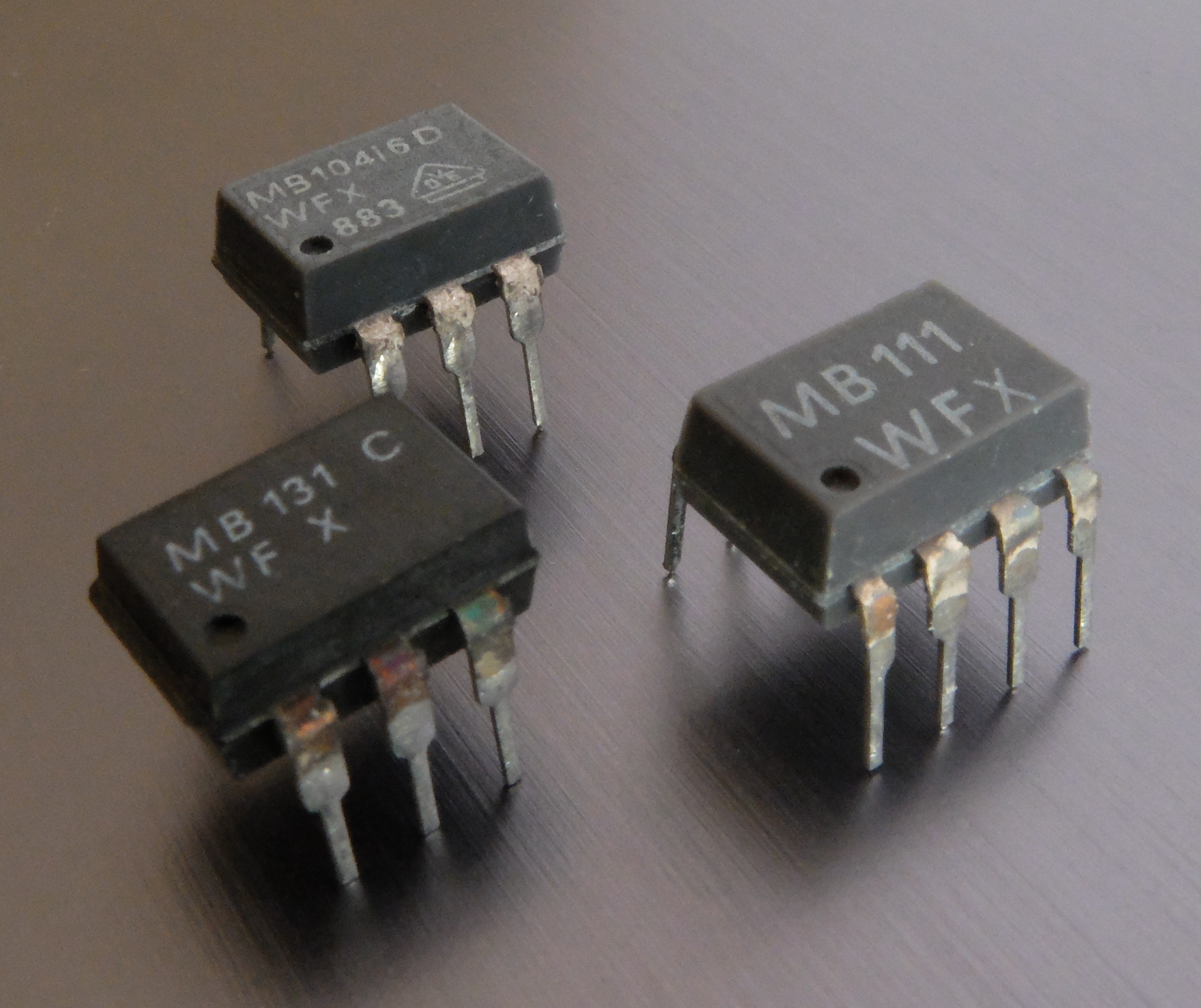
Optocouplers (VEB Werk für Fernsehelektronik Berlin)

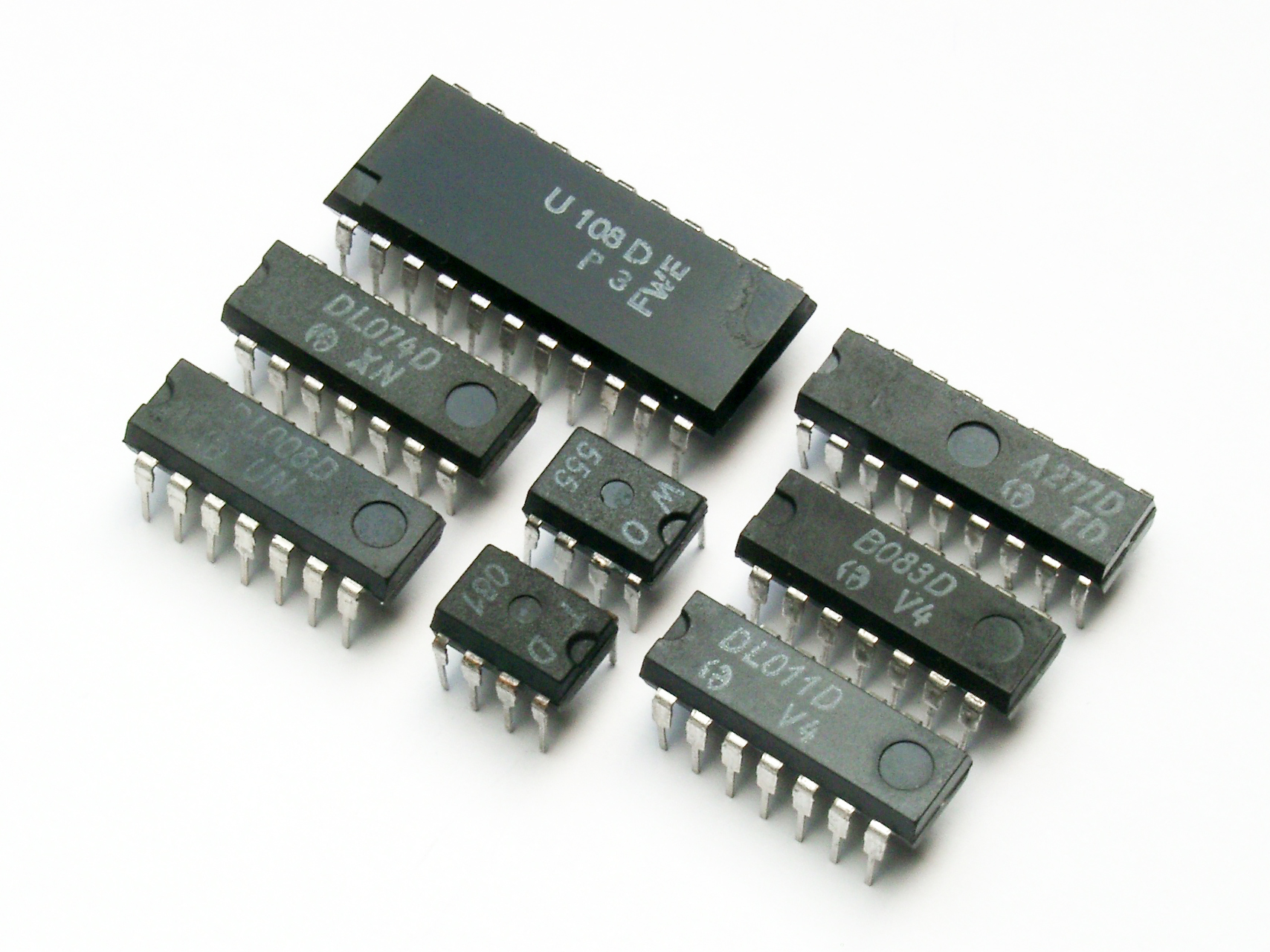
PMOS logic IC U108D (VEB Funkwerk Erfurt, 1982); all other IC from VEB Halbleiterwerk Frankfurt (Oder) 1985 - 1989

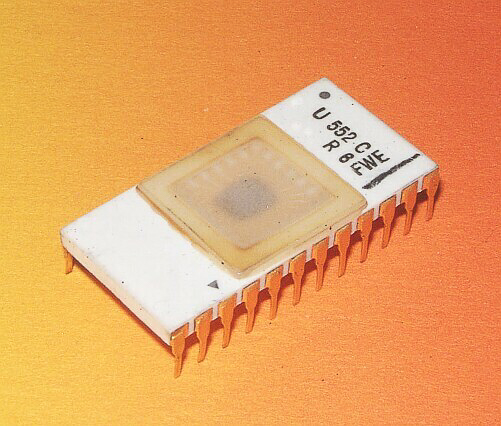
EPROM U552C (256x8 bit, VEB Funkwerk Erfurt, 1983)

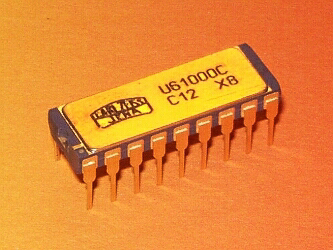
dRAM U61000CC12 (1Mx1 bit, VEB ZFTM Dresden - marked as "Carl Zeiss Jena", 1989)

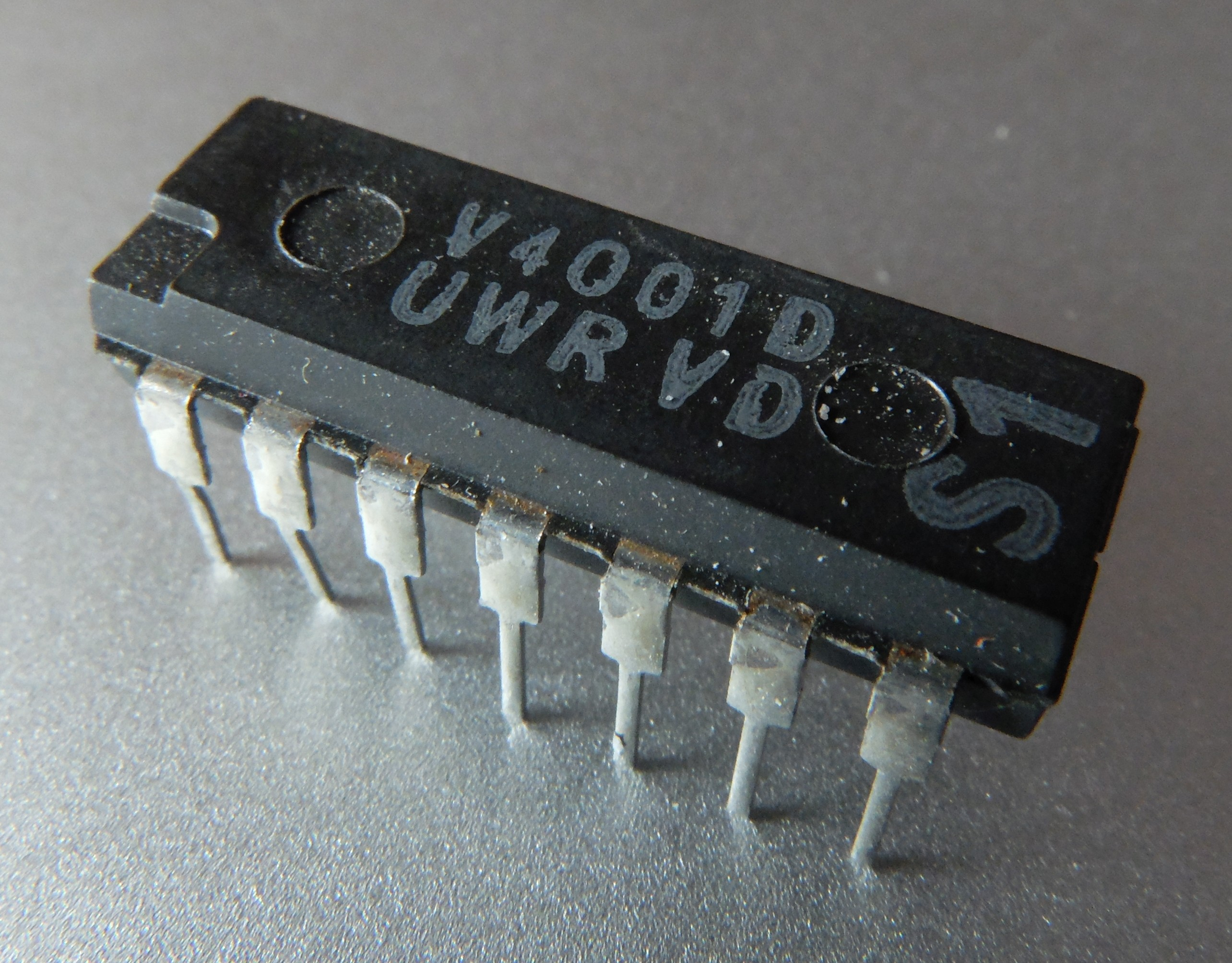
4000-series integrated circuit (VEB Uhrenwerke Ruhla, 1987)

=== Consumer goods ===
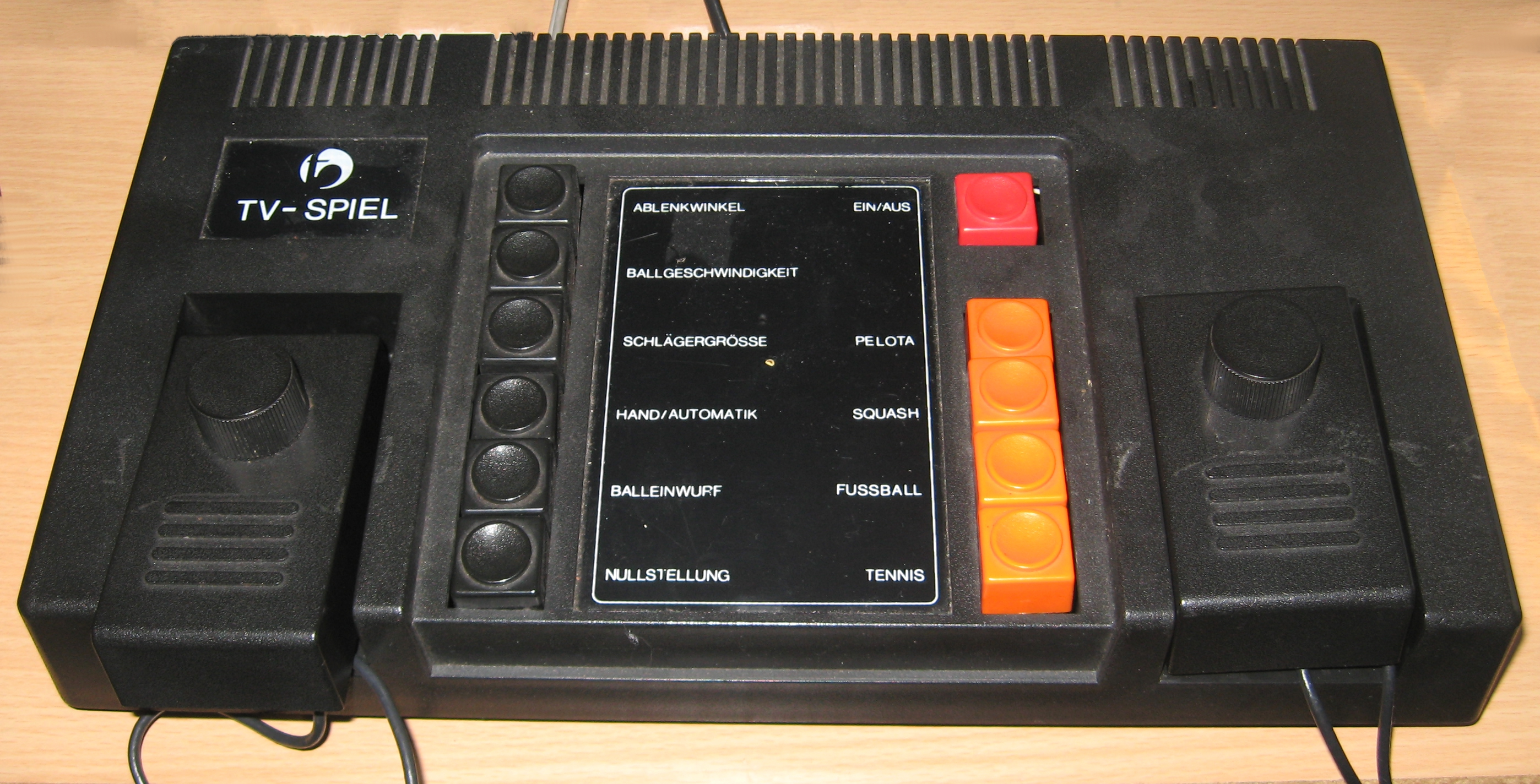
Video game console BSS 01 ( Bildschirmspiel 01; VEB Halbleiterwerk Frankfurt (Oder), 1980)

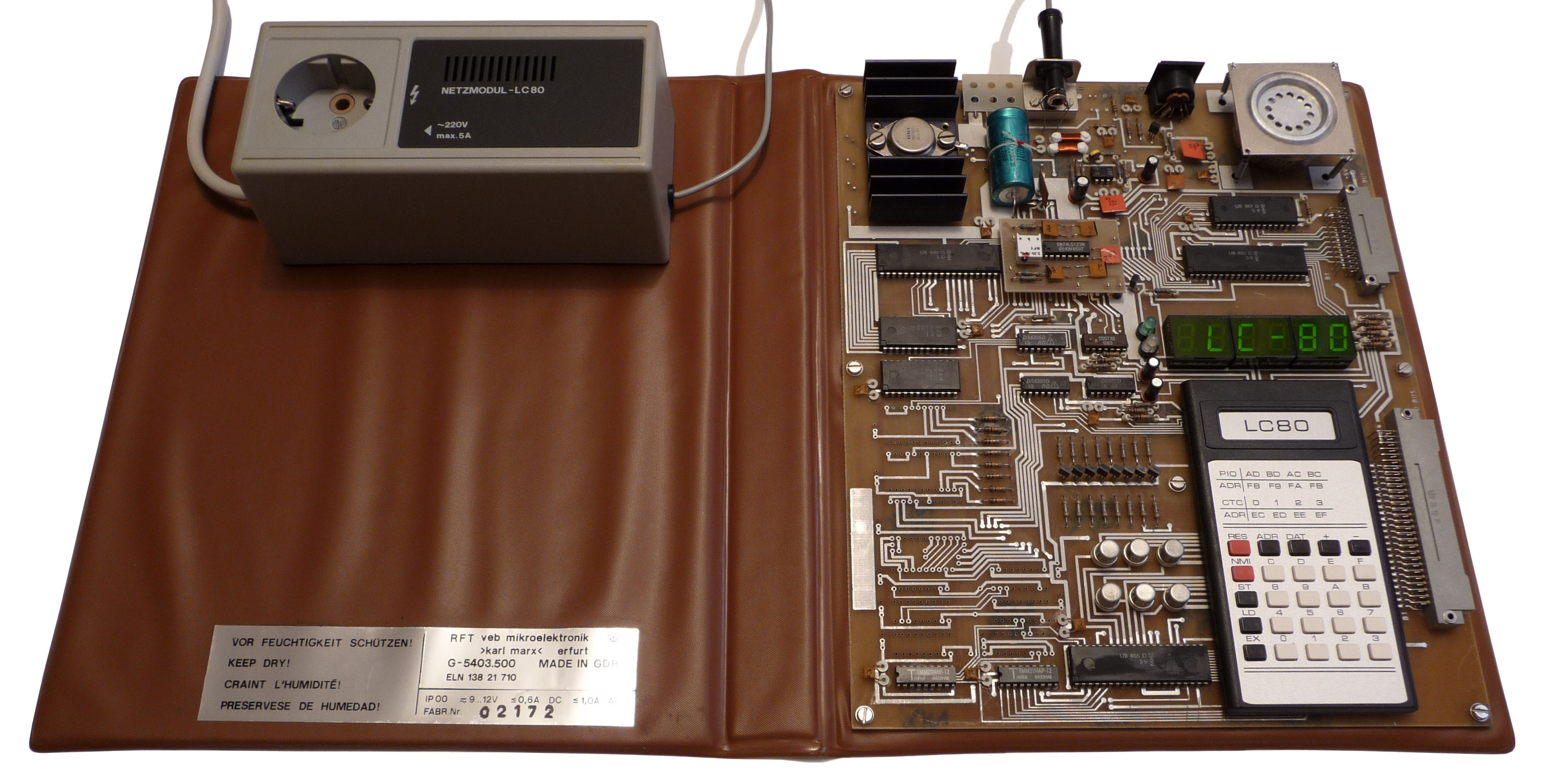
Microcomputer learning kit LC80 ( Lerncomputer 80; VEB Mikroelektronik "Karl Marx" Erfurt, 1984)

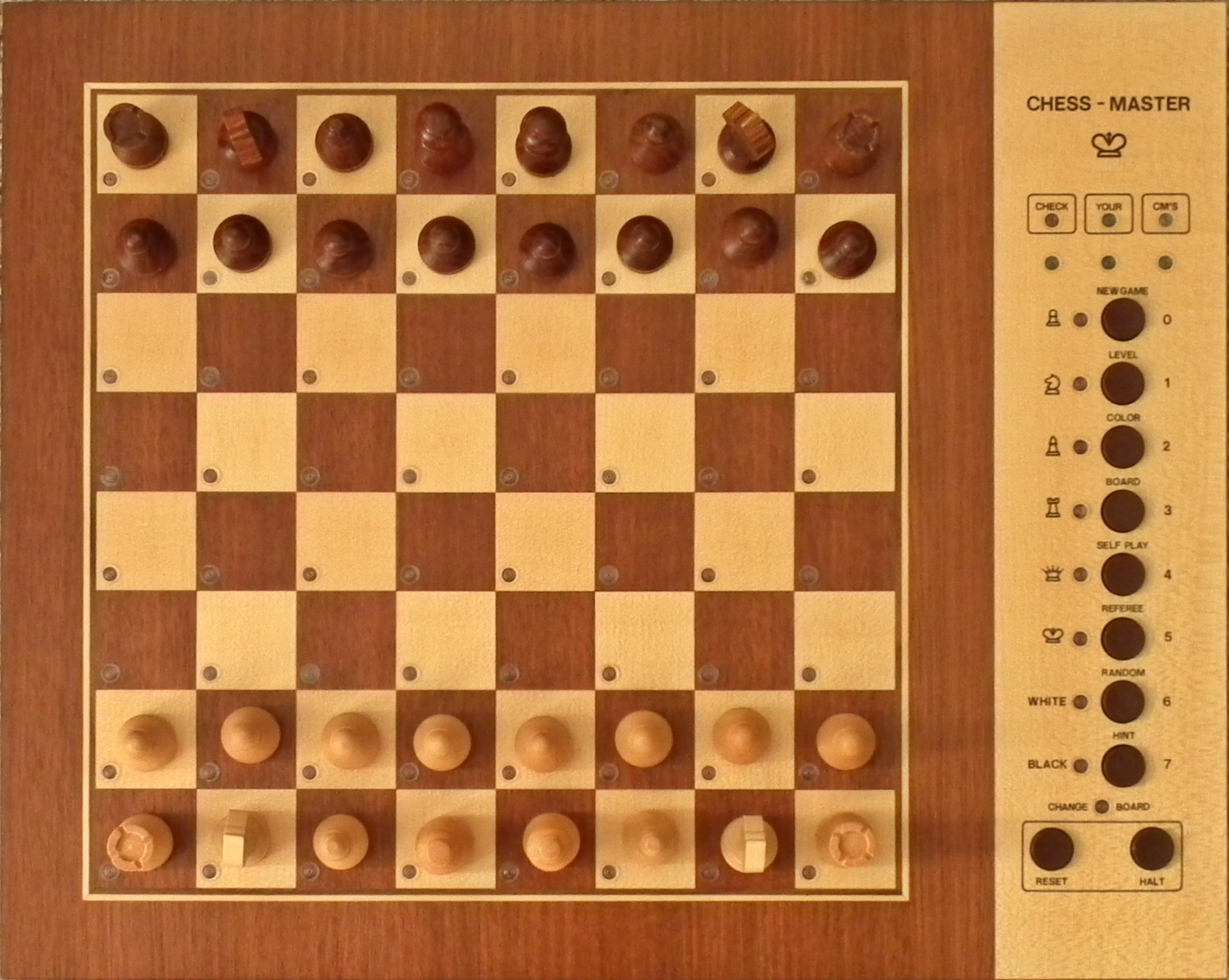
Chess computer CM ( Chess Master; VEB Mikroelektronik "Karl Marx" Erfurt, 1984)

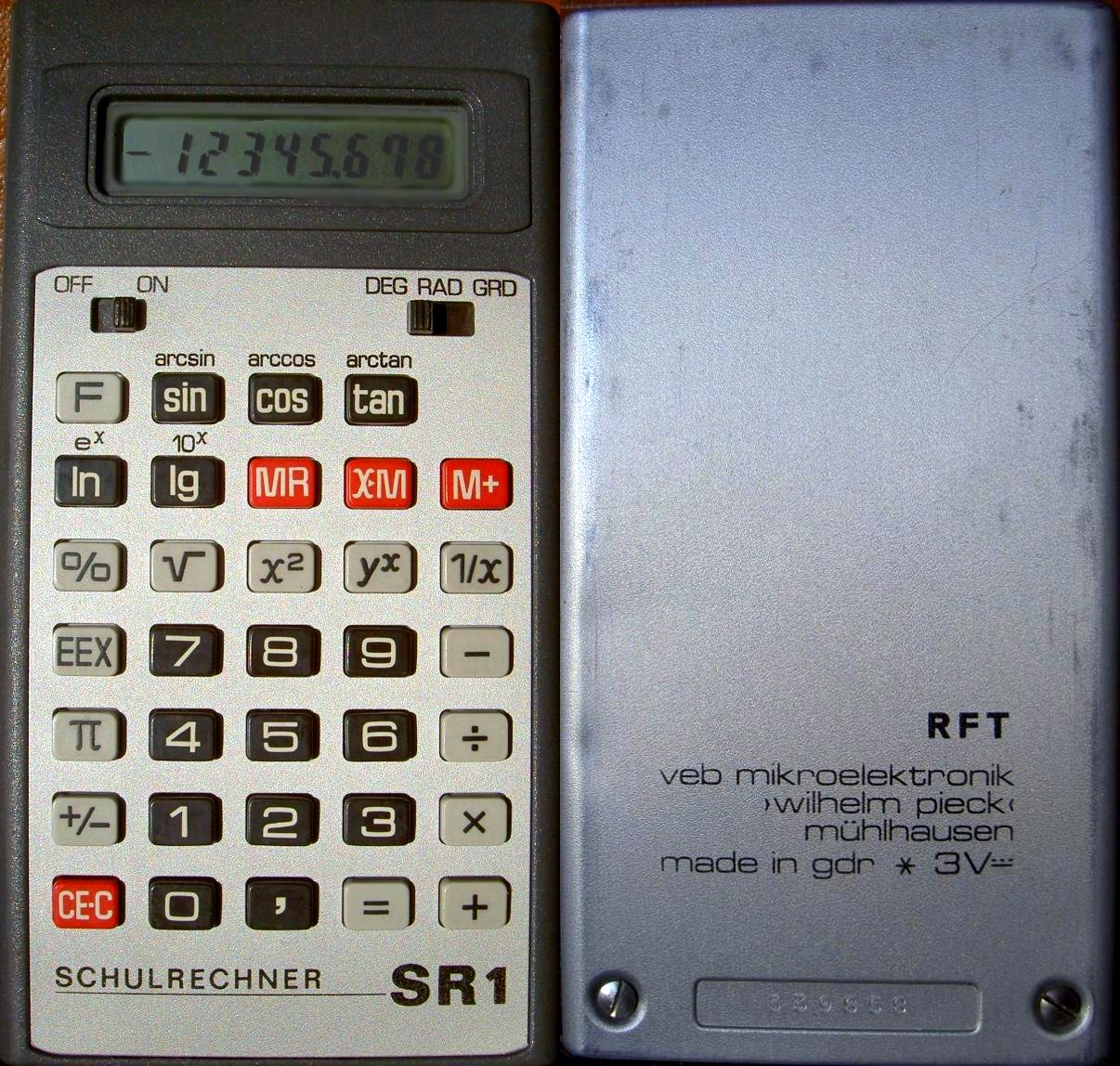
Pocket calculator SR1 ( Schulrechner 1; VEB Mikroelektronik "Wilhelm Pieck" Mühlhausen, 1984)

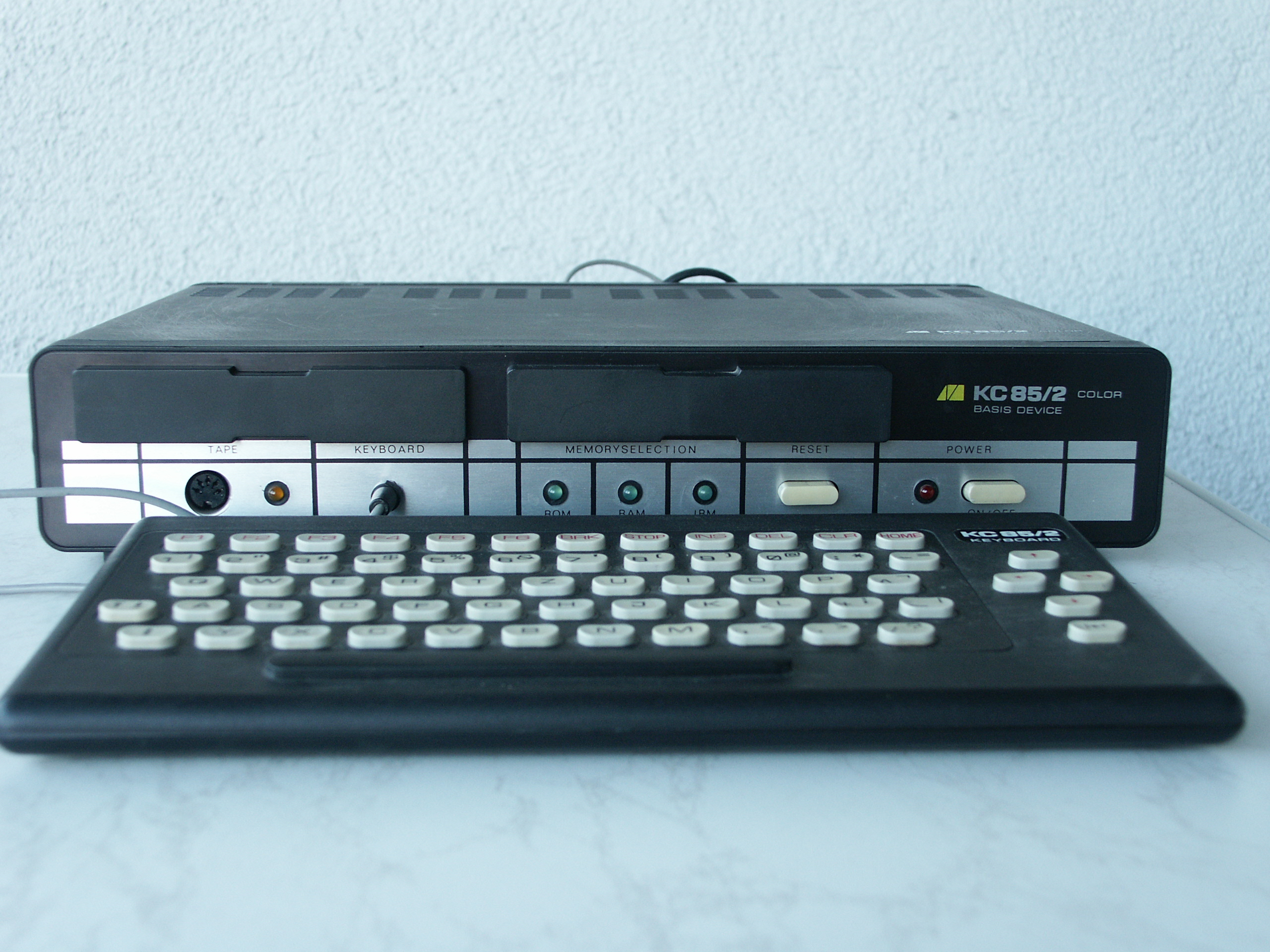
Home computer KC85/2 ( Kleincomputer 85/2; VEB Mikroelektronik "Wilhelm Pieck" Mühlhausen, 1984)

== Semiconductor designation ==
The type designations for both discrete semiconductor devices and integrated circuits were specified in state standard TGL 38015. The designations for discrete semiconductors are similar to the Pro Electron specification and are discussed there.

The type designation for integrated circuits initially (in 1971) consisted of one letter for the basic type and temperature range, a three-digit type number, and one letter for the package type. Over time this proved inflexible and the plants started adding letters for further temperature ranges, speed classes, etc. (e.g. a second letter after the basic type to indicate the speed class of a processor, as in UD8820M). In order to curb these somewhat uncoordinated extensions and also out of a desire to keep the type numbers in common with international equivalents, the standard was revised in 1986 (the revision came into force in April 1987). Almost arbitrary type numbers were allowed now, including additional letters in the type number if the international equivalent had them (e.g. U74HCT02DK). The temperature range was added as a separate letter at the end. A 2-digit number could follow the temperature letter in order to indicate the maximum clock frequency of a microprocessor (in MHz, e.g. U880DC08) or the access time of a memory circuit (in units of nanoseconds or tens of nanoseconds, e.g. U60998CC12). Existing type designations were kept even if they did not fully conform to the new standard (e.g. V4028D). Integrated circuits that did not meet the official specifications, were sold as hobbyist versions. More often than not, these were the only versions available to hobbyists. Before 1987 the hobbyist versions were assigned separate basic type letters while keeping the type number (e.g. an A109D that did not meet its specifications would become an R109D). From 1987 onwards, S1 was appended to the unchanged type designation for hobbyist versions (e.g. U6516D S1).

Basic types of integrated circuits
Basic type	Definition		Example
Basic type	Before 1987	From 1987 onwards	Example
A	Bipolar analogue integrated circuit; temperature range 0 °C to +70 °C	Bipolar analogue integrated circuit, primarily for consumer applications	A110D
B	Bipolar analogue integrated circuit; temperature range -25 °C to +85 °C	Bipolar analogue integrated circuit, primarily for industrial applications	B342D
C	Bipolar mixed-signal integrated circuits (analogue-to-digital converters and digital-to-analogue converters)		C574C
D	Bipolar digital integrated circuit; temperature range 0 °C to +70 °C	Bipolar digital integrated circuit	D103D
E	Bipolar digital integrated circuit; temperature range -25 °C to +85 °C	—	E435E
L	Charge-coupled device		L110C
N	Bipolar mixed-signal integrated circuits; hobbyist version of type C	—	N520D
P	Bipolar digital integrated circuit; hobbyist version of types D and E	—	P120D
R	Bipolar analogue integrated circuit; hobbyist version of types A and B	—	R283D
S	Unipolar integrated circuit; hobbyist version of types U and V	—	S114D
U	Unipolar integrated circuit; temperature range 0 °C to +70 °C	Unipolar integrated circuit	U103D
V	Unipolar integrated circuit; temperature range -25 °C to +85 °C	—	VB880D

Optional second letter (type group)
Second letter	Definition	Example
A	speed class of a microprocessor or microprocessor peripheral, A being the fasted and D the slowest (not specified in TGL 38015; only used by FWE / MME for products introduced before 1987)	UA880D
B	speed class of a microprocessor or microprocessor peripheral, A being the fasted and D the slowest (not specified in TGL 38015; only used by FWE / MME for products introduced before 1987)	UB8001C
C	speed class of a microprocessor or microprocessor peripheral, A being the fasted and D the slowest (not specified in TGL 38015; only used by FWE / MME for products introduced before 1987)	UC8841M
D	speed class of a microprocessor or microprocessor peripheral, A being the fasted and D the slowest (not specified in TGL 38015; only used by FWE / MME for products introduced before 1987)	UD8811D
I	manufacturer-defined (test) layout of a master slice integrated circuit (only used by HFO; before 1987 basic type and second letter were reversed, i.e. IA / ID instead of AI / DI)	IA338D
K	customer-defined layout of a master slice integrated circuit (only used by HFO; before 1987 basic type and second letter were reversed, i.e. KA / KD instead of AK / DK)	DK708G
L	low-power variant (bipolar digital integrated circuits DL usually were equivalent to the 74LS series)	UL224D30
S	fast variant (bipolar digital integrated circuits DS used Schottky transistors, with some equivalent to the 74S series)	DS8205D

New package type letters were added in 1987 while the previously defined letters remained unchanged.

Package types
Package	Description	Example
C	Ceramic dual in-line package (DIP)	P192C
D	Plastic dual in-line package (DIP)	DL000D
E	Plastic dual in-line package (DIP) with tabs for heat sink attachment	R210E
F	Ceramic Flatpack or Quad Flat Package (QFP)	U80701FC
G	Plastic Flatpack or Quad Flat Package (QFP)	U825G
H	Multi-leaded power package for horizontal mounting	R2030H
K	Dual in-line package with fixed heat sink	A210K
M	Plastic Quad in-line package (QIL)	UB8820M
N	Plastic SOT package, especially SOT54	B589N
P	Plastic chip carrier package	U80601PC08
R	Ceramic chip carrier package	U80601RA04
S	Small Outline Package (SOP)	B2765SG
V	Multi-leaded power package for vertical mounting	A2005V
X	Bare chip without package	U132X

In the early years all integrated circuit packages were manufactured with a spacing of 2.5 mm between pins just like in the Soviet Union and unlike the 2.54 mm (1/10") spacing used in the West. Over time more and more circuits with 16 or more pins were produced with a 2.54 mm spacing. Where a certain circuit was available with either of the two spacings, TGL 38015 required that the version with a 2.54 mm spacing be marked with the letter "Z" (for German: Zoll) on the package.

The temperature range letter was introduced only in 1987 and therefore not many integrated circuits were labelled with it.

Operating temperature ranges
Letter	Range	Example
A	Range not listed in TGL 38015	B3040DA
B	+5 °C to +55 °C	U61000CB12
C	0 °C to +70 °C	U82720DC03
D	−10 °C to +70 °C	A1670VD
E	−10 °C to +85 °C	B467GE
F	−25 °C to +70 °C	L220CF
G	−25 °C to +85 °C	U7660DG
K	−40 °C to +85 °C	U74HCT04DK

Beside the type designation the manufacturing date was printed on integrated circuits. From 1978 onwards the IEC 60062 letter and digit code was used for manufacturing date (the respective state standard TGL 31667 does not mention IEC 60062 but the encoding is identical).

Following the dissolution of Kombinat Mikroelektronik in 1990, the plants in Frankfurt (Oder) and Erfurt kept using the East German integrated circuit designation until 1992 while ZMD in Dresden applied a slightly modified version until about 2005 (albeit with the date code in a 4-digit year/month format since 1991).

The East German integrated circuit designation was also used by Componentes Electrónicos "Ernesto Che Guevara" in Pinar del Río in the late 1980s (e.g. A210).

== See also ==
- Electronics industry in East Germany
- VEB Robotron
