= Robotron K 1820 =

East German clone of the MicroVAX II computer

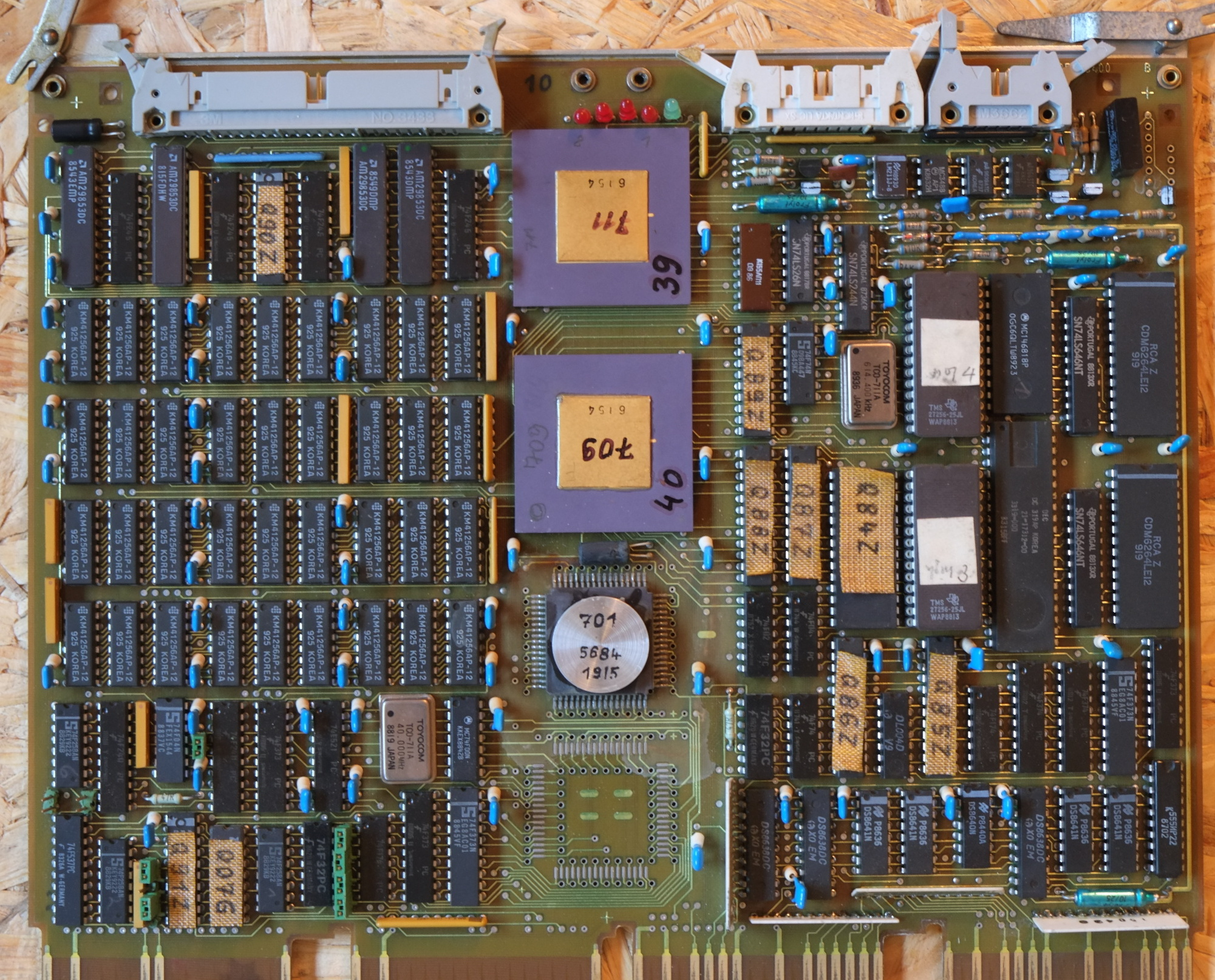
K 1820 processor board

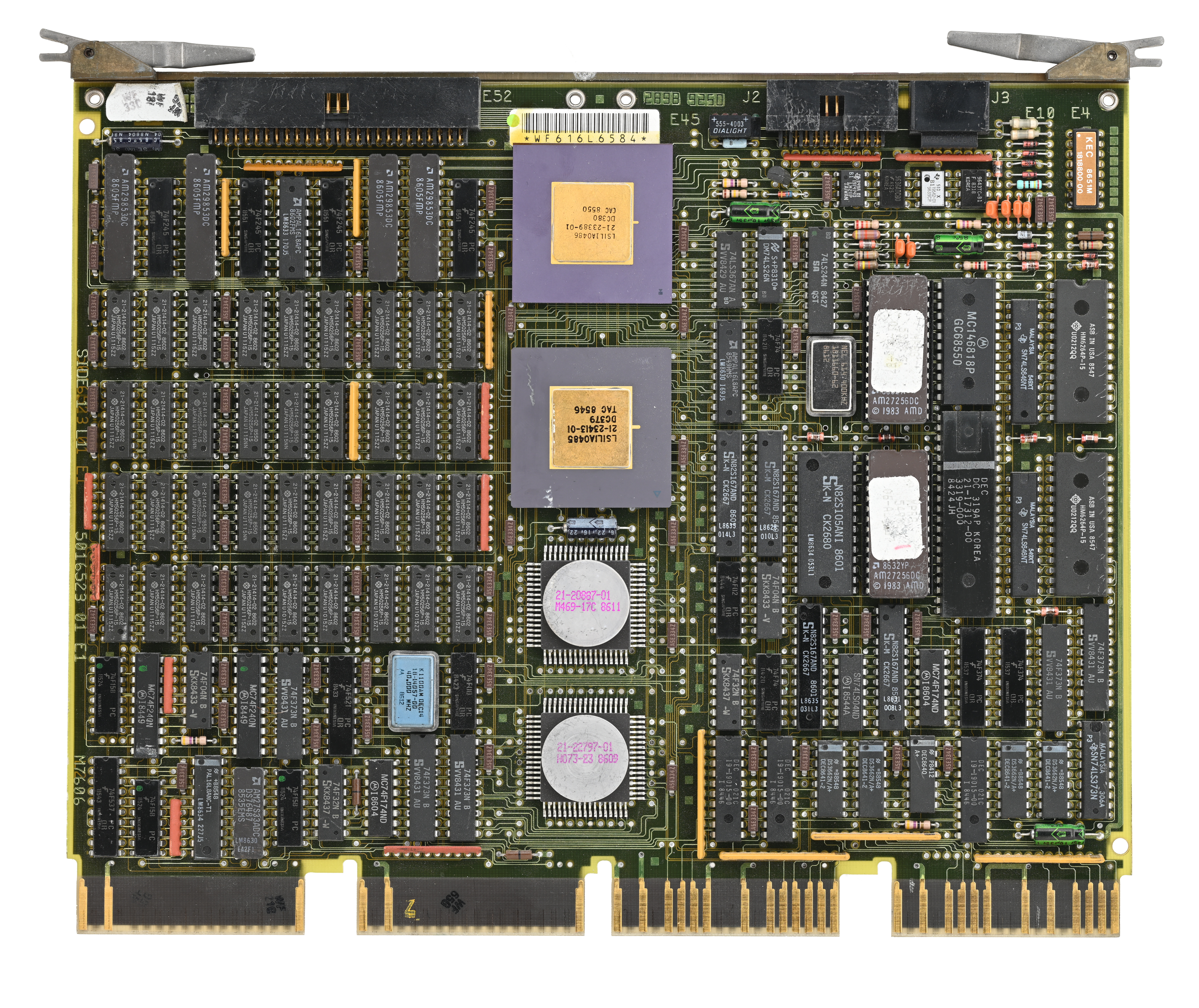
Original DEC KA630-AA processor board

The K 1820, full name RVS K 1820 (Rechnersystem mit virtuellem Speicher, "computer system with virtual memory"), cipher in the SM EVM of the former COMECON countries SM 1720, is a workstation developed in East Germany. VEB Robotron Elektronik Dresden began development of the K 1820 in 1986 and it went into serial production in 1990.

== Minicomputer ==
The K 1820 is a clone of the MicroVAX II made by Digital Equipment Corporation (DEC). The import of western 32-bit computers to the COMECON area was impeded by the CoCom technology embargo. As the MicroVAX II CPU is one of the first semiconductor devices which was protected by the Semiconductor Chip Protection Act of 1984, independent development of modern CAD technology based on a 32-bit computer architecture began. Copies of the MicroVAX II were also created in Hungary (MicroSTAR 32 or TPA-11/510) and the Soviet Union (SМ 1702).

The K 1820 extends the VAX-compatible computer line in the SM EVM and the models of the K 1820 achieve approximately 90% of the performance of the K 1840 (Robotron "RVS K 1840", compatible with the VAX 11/780). The K 1820 is fully compatible with K 1840 software, so preexisting system and application software can be used.

The K 1820 is based on the VLSI U80700-microprocessor system, its 32-bit CPU U80701 was developed according to the MicroVAX 78032. The mainboard design and construction are original. A VT220-compatible terminal, the K 8941, was developed for the machine.

Approximately 10 K 1820 prototypes were built up to 1990. In the middle of 1990 development was stopped, because economic production was not possible under free-market conditions after the monetary, economic and social union between East and West Germany on 1 July 1990. Subsequent to this Robotron's traditional markets in the Soviet Union and Eastern Europe collapsed.

At least one prototype of the K 1820 is owned by the Technische Sammlungen Museum.
