= U80701 =

32-bit microprocessor developed in the German Democratic Republic

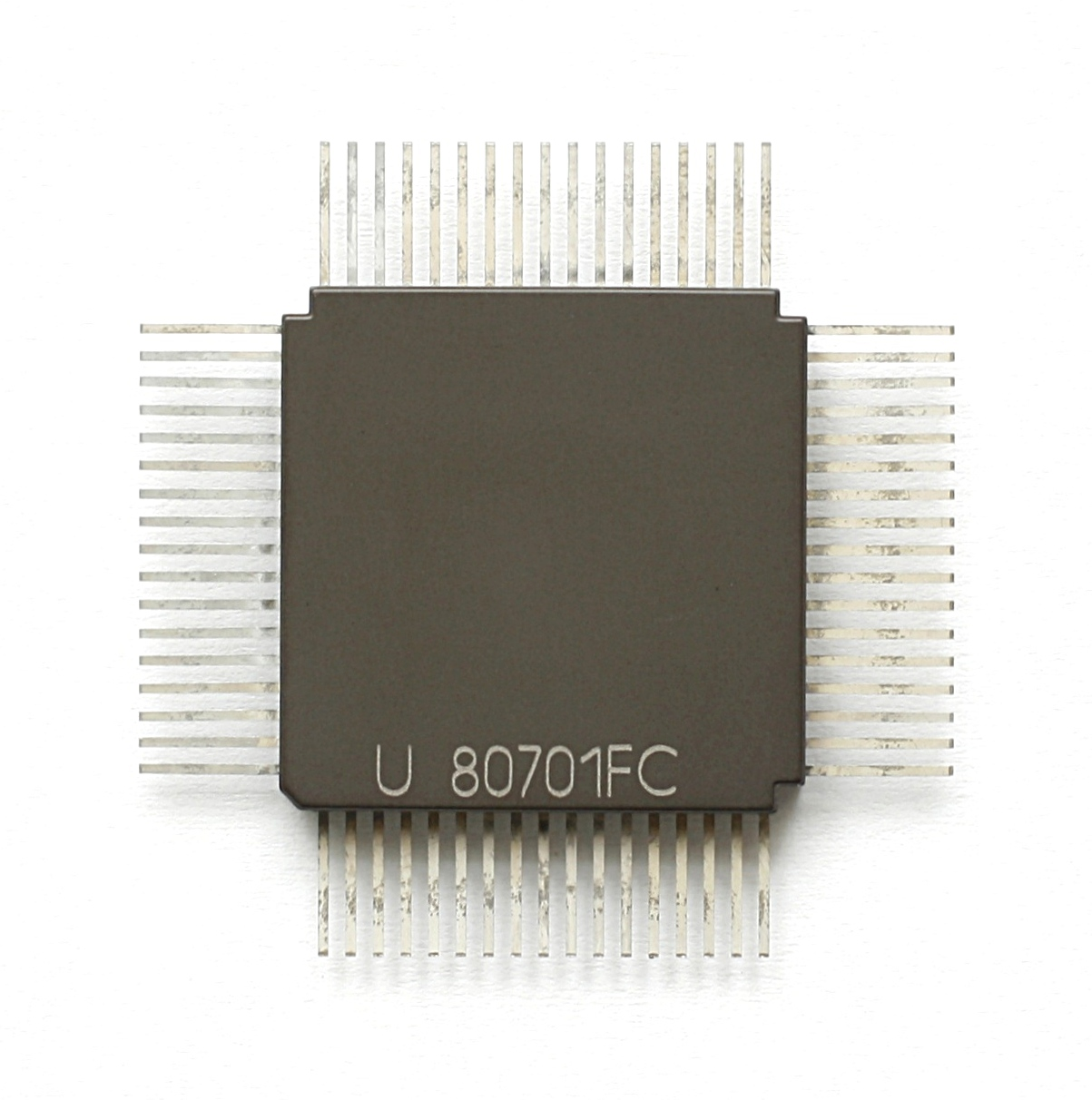
U80701FC

The U80701 is a 32-bit microprocessor developed from 1986-1990 in the German Democratic Republic. It was manufactured by VEB Mikroelektronik "Karl Marx" Erfurt (MME) in NMOS technology and is encased in a ceramic quad flat package (CQFP-68 package).

== Microprocessor ==
The U80701 was developed by reverse engineering the MicroVAX 78032 microprocessor of the Digital Equipment Corporation (DEC). It is used in the Robotron K 1820 minicomputer - a clone of the DEC MicroVAX II.

The microprocessor used the 40 MHz input clock.

The U80700 system includes the following chips:

- U80701: CPU (DC333)
- U80703: FPU (DC337)
- U80707: Console interface/controller DLART (DC319)
- U80709: CPU interface gate array (DC379)
- U80711: Q22-Bus interface gate array (DC380)
