= MicroVAX =

Family of low-cost minicomputers

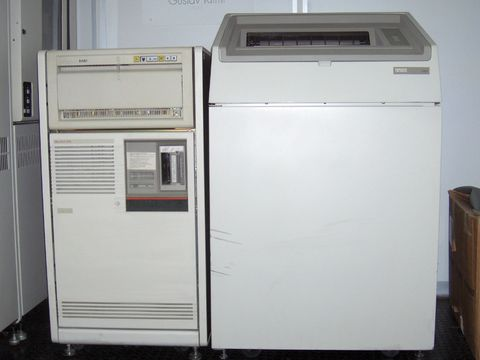
Left: A MicroVAX 3600 with a disk drive on top. Right: A printer

The MicroVAX is a discontinued family of low-cost minicomputers developed and manufactured by Digital Equipment Corporation (DEC). The first model, the MicroVAX I, shipped in 1984. The series uses processors that implement the VAX instruction set architecture (ISA) and were succeeded by the VAX 4000. Many members of the MicroVAX family have corresponding VAXstation variants, which primarily differ by the addition of graphics hardware. The MicroVAX family supports Digital's VMS, ULTRIX, and VAXELN operating systems. Prior to VMS V5.0, MicroVAX hardware required a dedicated version of VMS named MicroVMS.

== MicroVAX I ==
The MicroVAX I, code-named Seahorse, introduced in October 1984, was one of DEC's first VAX computers to use very-large-scale integration (VLSI) technology. The KA610 CPU module (also known as the KD32) contains two custom chips which implemented the ALU and FPU while TTL chips were used for everything else. Two variants of the floating point chips are supported, with the chips differing by the type of floating-point instructions supported, F and G, or F and D. The system was implemented on two quad-height Q-bus cards, a Data Path Module (DAP) and Memory Controller (MCT). The MicroVAX I uses Q-bus memory cards, which limits the maximum memory to 4MiB. The performance of the MicroVAX I is rated at 0.3 VUPs, equivalent to the earlier VAX-11/730.

== MicroVAX II ==
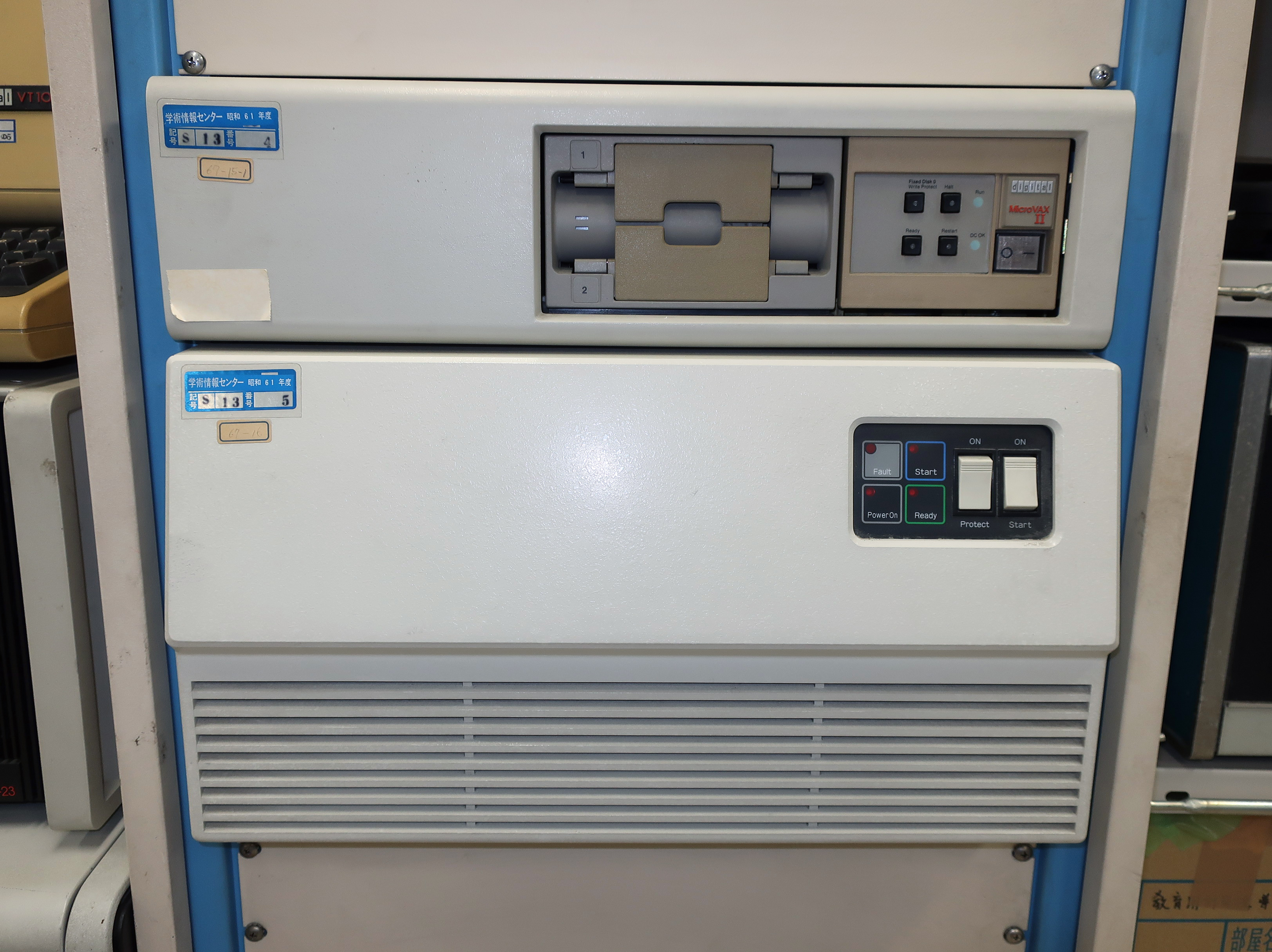
MicroVAX II front

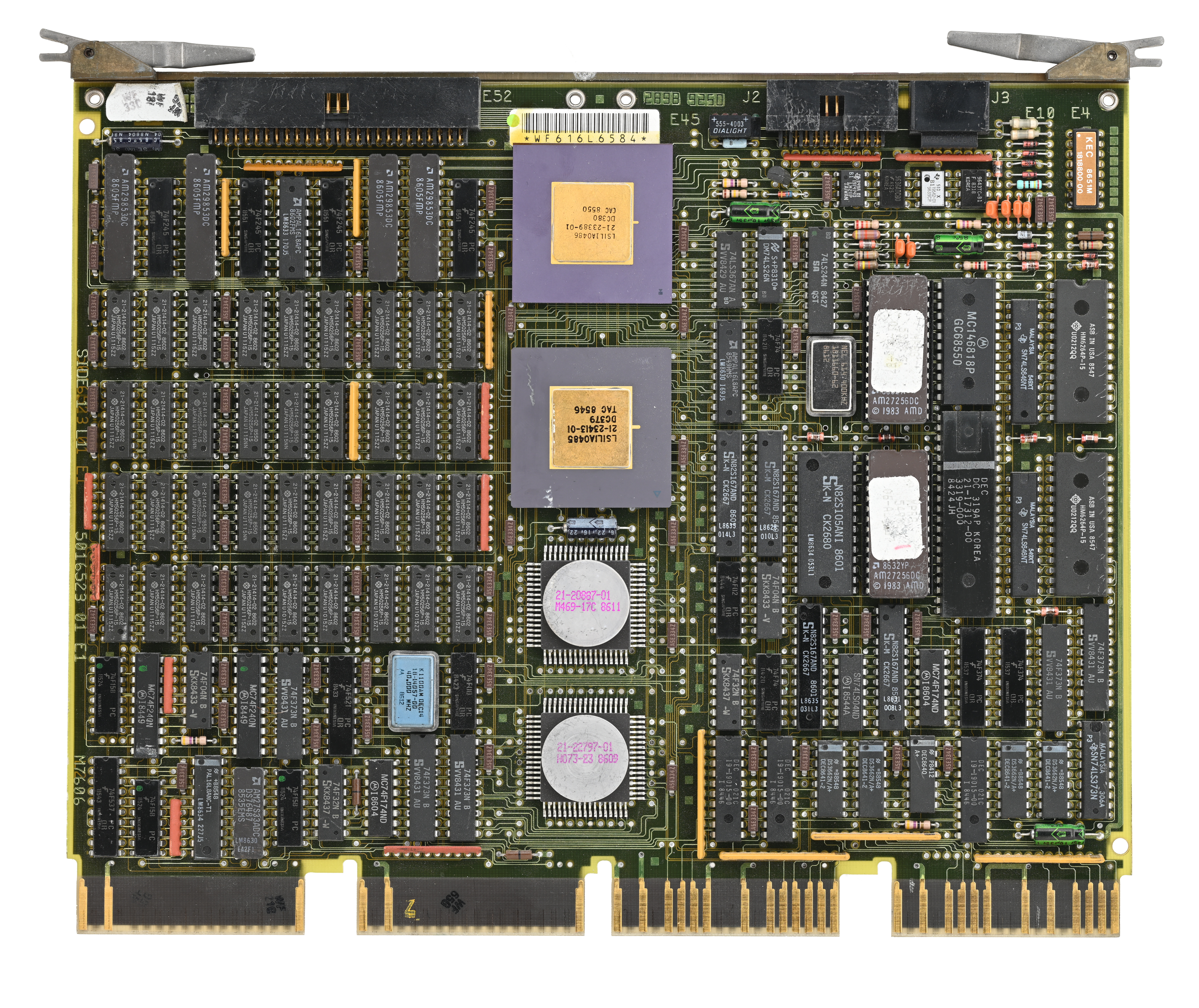
KA630-AA CPU module

The MicroVAX II, code-named Mayflower, is a mid-range MicroVAX introduced in May 1985 and shipped shortly thereafter. It replaced the original MicroVAX in DEC's product line; the company offered a field upgrade to existing customers. MicroVAX II runs VAX/VMS or, alternatively, ULTRIX, DEC's Unix operating system. At least one non-DEC commercial operating system was available, BSD Unix from mt Xinu.

MicroVAX II was designed to provide 70-110% of VAX-11/780 performance at a lower price. It runs all VAX software but is not compatible with all peripherals, and at launch was not capable of VAXclustering. As DEC did not adjust prices for older computers, Forrester Research predicted that customers would prefer MicroVAX II to VAX-11/725, 730, and possibly 750. It uses the KA630-AA CPU module, a quad-height Q22-Bus module, with a MicroVAX 78032 microprocessor and a MicroVAX 78132 floating-point coprocessor operating at 5 MHz (200 ns cycle time). Two gate arrays on the module implement the external interface for the microprocessor, Q22-bus interface and the scatter-gather map for DMA transfers over the Q22-Bus. The module also contains 1 MB of memory, an interval timer, two ROMs for the boot and diagnostic facility, a DZ console serial line unit, and a time-of-year clock. A 50-pin connector for a ribbon cable near the top left corner of the module provides the means by which more memory is added to the system.

The minicomputer supports 1 to 16 MB of memory through zero, one or two memory expansion modules. The MS630 memory expansion module is used for expanding memory capacity. Four variants of the MS630 exists: the 1 MB MS630-AA, 2 MB MS630-BA, 4 MB MS630-BB and the 8MB MS630-CA. The MS630-AA is a dual-height module, whereas the MS630-BA, MS630-BB, and MS630-CA are quad-height modules. These modules use 256 Kb DRAMs and are protected by byte-parity, with the parity logic located on the module. The modules connect to the CPU module via the backplane through the C and D rows and a 50-conductor ribbon cable. The backplane serves as the address bus and the ribbon cable as the data bus.

The MicroVAX II came in three models of enclosure:

- BA23
- BA123
- 630QE - A deskside enclosure.

DEC at the same time also announced the VAXstation II, a workstation based on MicroVAX II's CPU and also replacing the original VAXstation.

The Robotron K 1820 is a copy of the MicroVAX II developed in the GDR and was produced for a short period of time in 1990.

=== KA620 ===
KA620 refers to a single-board MicroVAX II designed for automatic test equipment and manufacturing applications which only runs DEC's real-time VAXELN operating system. A KA620 with 1 MB of memory bundled with the VAXELN Run-Time Package 2.3 was priced at US$5,000.

=== Mira ===
Mira refers to a fault-tolerant configuration of the MicroVAX II developed by DEC's European Centre for Special Systems located in Annecy in France. The system consists of two MicroVAX 78032 microprocessors, an active and standby microprocessor in a single box, connected by Ethernet and controlled by a software switch. When a fault was detected in the active microprocessor, the workload switches over to the standby microprocessor.

=== Industrial VAX 630 ===
A MicroVAX II in BA213 enclosure.

=== MicroVAX III ===
BA23- or BA123-enclosure MicroVAX upgraded with KA650 CPU module containing a CVAX chip set.

==== MicroVAX III+ ====
BA23- or BA123-enclosure MicroVAX upgraded with KA655 CPU module.

=== VAX 4 ===
BA23- or BA123-enclosure MicroVAX upgraded with KA660 CPU module.

== MicroVAX 2000 ==
The MicroVAX 2000, code-named TeamMate, is a low-cost MicroVAX introduced on 10 February 1987. In January 1987, the MicroVAX 2000 was the first VAX system targeted at both universities and VAX programmers who wanted to work from remote locations.

The MicroVAX 2000 uses the same microprocessor and floating-point coprocessor as the MicroVAX II, but was feature reduced in order to lower the cost. Limitations are a reduced maximum memory capacity, 14 MB versus 16 MB in MicroVAX II systems, and the lack of Q-Bus or any expansion bus. The system can have a Shugart-based harddrive with ST412 interface and MFM encoding and has a built in 5.25-inch floppy drive (named RX33 in DEC jargon) for software distribution and backup. Supported operating systems are VMS and ULTRIX. It is in a desktop form factor.

== MicroVAX 3100 Series ==
The MicroVAX 3100 Series was introduced in 1987. These systems are all packaged in desktop enclosures.

MicroVAX 3100 Model 10
Teammate II
KA41-A, CVAX, 11.11 MHz (90 ns)

MicroVAX 3100 Model 10e
Teammate II
KA41-D, CVAX+, 16.67 MHz (60 ns)
32 MB of memory maximum.

MicroVAX 3100 Model 20
Teammate II
KA41-A, CVAX, 11.11 MHz (90 ns)
A Model 10 in larger enclosure.

MicroVAX 3100 Model 20e
Teammate II
KA41-D, CVAX+, 16.67 MHz (60 ns)
A Model 10e in larger enclosure.

MicroVAX 3100 Model 30
Waverley/S
Entry-level model, developed in Ayr, Scotland
Introduced: 12 October 1993
KA45, SOC, 25 MHz (40 ns)
32 MB of memory maximum.

MicroVAX 3100 Model 40
Waverley/S
Entry-level model, developed in Ayr, Scotland
Introduced: 12 October 1993
KA45, SOC, 25 MHz (40 ns)
8 to 32 MB of memory
A Model 30 in larger enclosure.

MicroVAX 3100 Model 80
Waverley/M
Entry-level model, developed in Ayr, Scotland
Introduced: 12 October 1993
KA47, Mariah, 50 MHz (20 ns), 256 KB external cache
72 MB of memory maximum.

MicroVAX 3100 Model 85
Waverley/M+
Introduced: August 1994
KA55, NVAX, 62.5 MHz (16 ns), 128 KB external cache
16 to 128 MB of memory.

MicroVAX 3100 Model 88
Waverley/M+
Introduced: 8 October 1996
Last order date: 30 September 2000
Last ship date: 31 December 2000
KA58, NVAX, 62.5 MHz (16 ns), 128 KB external cache
64 to 512 MB of memory.

MicroVAX 3100 Model 90
Cheetah
Introduced: 12 October 1993
Identical to the VAX 4000 Model 100, but uses SCSI instead of DSSI
KA50, NVAX, 72 MHz (14 ns), 128 KB external cache
128 MB of memory maximum.

MicroVAX 3100 Model 95
Cheetah+
Introduced: 12 April 1994
Processor: KA51, NVAX, 83.34 MHz (12 ns), 512 KB external cache.

MicroVAX 3100 Model 96
Cheetah++
KA56, NVAX, 100 MHz (10 ns)
16 to 128 MB of memory.

MicroVAX 3100 Model 98
Cheetah++
Introduced: 8 October 1996
Last order date: 30 September 2000
Last ship date: 31 December 2000
KA59, NVAX, 100 MHz (10 ns), 512 KB external cache.

InfoServer 100/150/1000
General purpose storage server (disk, CD-ROM, tape and MOP boot server) related to MicroVAX 3100 Model 10, running custom firmware, KA41-C CPU.

== Mayfair ==
=== MicroVAX 3500 and MicroVAX 3600 ===
The MicroVAX 3500 and MicroVAX 3600, code-named Mayfair, were introduced in September 1987 and were meant to be the higher end complement of the MicroVAX family. These new machines feature more than three times the performance of the MicroVAX II and support 32 MB of ECC main memory, twice that of the MicroVAX II. The performance improvements over the MicroVAX II results from the increased clock rate of the CVAX chip set, which operates at 11.11 MHz (90 ns cycle time) along with a two-level, write-through caching architecture. It uses the KA650 CPU module.

=== MicroVAX 3300 and MicroVAX 3400 ===
The MicroVAX 3300 and MicroVAX 3400, code-named Mayfair II, are entry-level to mid-range server computers introduced on 19 October 1988 intended to compete with the IBM AS/400. They used the KA640 CPU module.

=== MicroVAX 3800 and MicroVAX 3900 ===
The MicroVAX 3800 and MicroVAX 3900, code-named Mayfair III, were introduced in April 1989. They are high-end models in the MicroVAX family, replacing the MicroVAX 3500 and MicroVAX 3600, and intended to compete with the IBM AS/400. At introduction, the starting price of the MicroVAX 3800 was US$81,000 and that of the MicroVAX 3900 was US$120,200. A variant of the MicroVAX 3800, the rtVAX 3800, was intended for real-time computing (RTC) applications such as computer-aided manufacturing (CAM). These systems use the KA655 CPU module, which contains a 16.67 MHz (60 ns cycle time) CVAX chip set. They support up to 64 MB of memory.
