= Innovations for High Performance Microelectronics =

German research institute

- Location within Brandenburg

General information
- Status: Research Facilities
- Location: Frankfurt (Oder)
- Coordinates: 52.3181°N 14.4898°E

Website
- www.ihp-microelectronics.com

Leibniz-Institut für innovative Mikroelektronik (English: Innovations for High Performance Microelectronics) is a German research institute located in Frankfurt (Oder), Brandenburg, Germany. The IHP was founded in 1983 as Institut für Halbleiterphysik (English: Institute for Semiconductor Physics), and is today part of the Gottfried Wilhelm Leibniz Scientific Community. The institute has four departments: System Design, Circuit Design, Technology and Materials Research.

== History ==
=== Origins ===
The origins of IHP date back to 1958 with the founding of the VEB Physikalische Werkstätten in Berlin-Rahnsdorf, which opened a branch in Falkenhagen in 1962. In 1963, it was incorporated into the German Academy of Sciences as the III Physico-Technical Institute. Following academy reforms in 1969, it was renamed the Institute for Physics of Materials Processing (IPW). By 1972, the Falkenhagen branch began fundamental research into abrasive machining of silicon wafers, and by 1975, focused on optimizing silicon component technology. Construction of a new facility in Frankfurt (Oder) began with a groundbreaking ceremony on April 29, 1981.

=== Founding of IHP ===
The Institute for Semiconductor Physics (IHP) was formally established on December 22, 1983, as an institute of the Academy of Sciences of the GDR. Its primary mandate was to develop the scientific foundations for microelectronic components, specifically focusing on the miniaturization of electronic structures. Following the political and economic shifts of 1989, the IHP was repositioned within the unified German research landscape.

=== Re-founding and realignments ===
On January 1, 1992, the IHP was re-founded as a GmbH (limited liability company) under the "Blue List" (now the Leibniz Association). In 1999, it began operating as the Institute for Innovative Microelectronics, retaining the abbreviation IHP to stand for Innovations for High Performance microelectronics.

Since 1996, research has shifted toward wireless and broadband communication. In 1999, the institute moved to the East Brandenburg Technology Park, opening a 1,000-square-meter Class 1 cleanroom featuring 0.25 μm BiCMOS technology. Research fields expanded into automotive, medical technology, and aerospace. Since 2008, the institute has utilized 0.13 μm BiCMOS technology with cut-off frequencies reaching 300 GHz. In December 2008, "Leibniz" was officially added to its name.

=== IHP Solutions GmbH ===
Founded in August 2015, IHP Solutions GmbH is a wholly-owned subsidiary serving as the commercial interface for the institute. It focuses on technology transfer, including industrial projects, commercial applications, and spin-offs. It provides access to IHP's SiGe BiCMOS technology for custom ASICs.

== See also ==
- Communicant Semiconductor Technologies
- Halbleiterwerk Frankfurt (Oder) (HFO, tr. "Semiconductor Factory in Frankfurt (Oder)")
