= Communicant Semiconductor Technologies =

German company based in Frankfurt (Oder)

Coordinates: 52.3223°N 14.5006°E

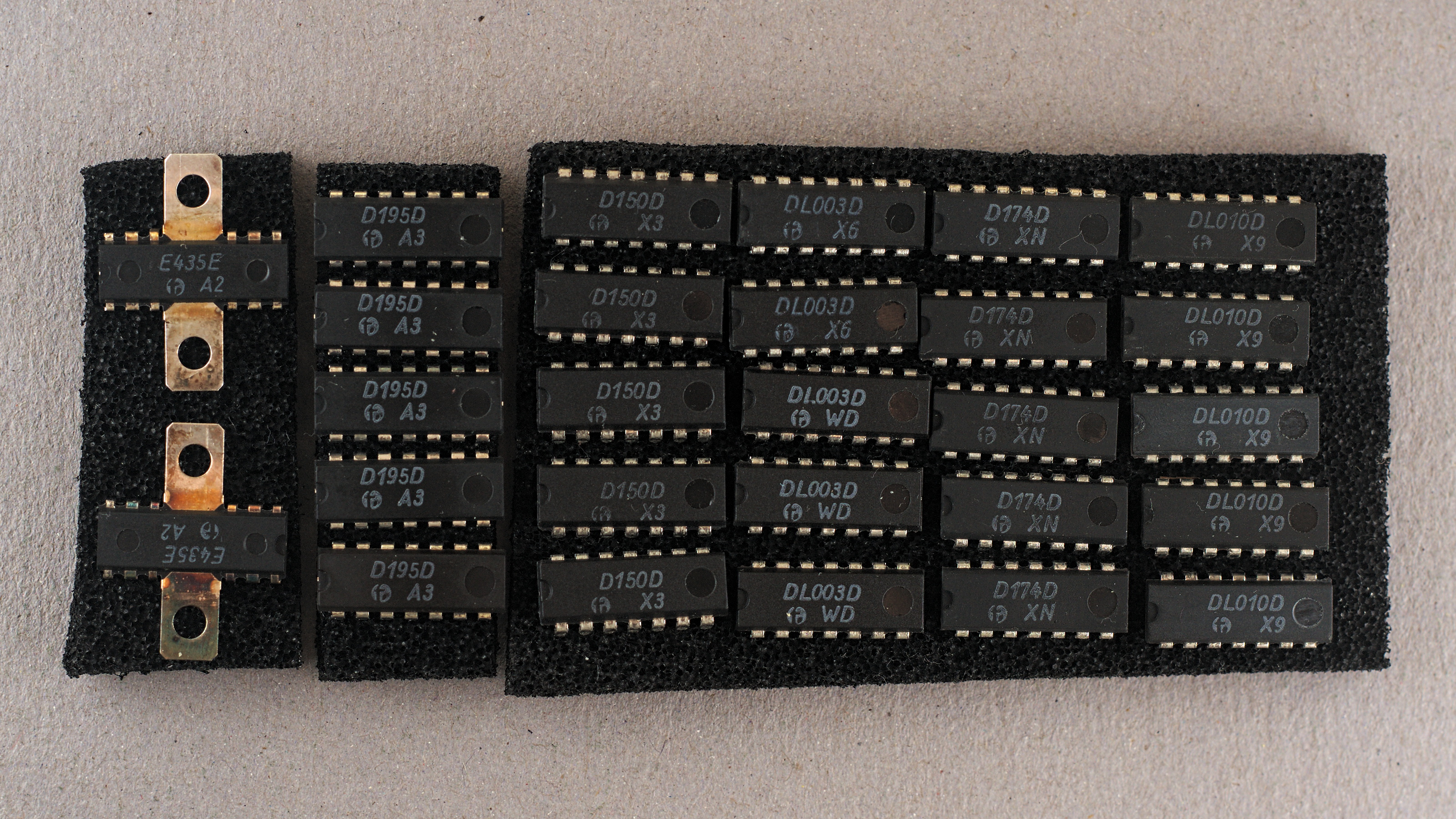
Some integrated circuits manufactured in a Cold War predecessor of Communicant, a state-owned enterprise called Halbleiterwerk Frankfurt (Oder). HFO was East Germany's biggest producer of microelectronics. All ICs shown here are (sometimes slightly changed) copies of either US American or West German types.

Communicant Semiconductor Technologies AG was a company based in Frankfurt (Oder), Eastern Germany, that aimed to mass-produce integrated circuits based on a carbon-doped silicon-germanium (Si-Ge:C) technology. The technology was developed by a local institute founded during the Communist era, Innovations for High Performance Microelectronics (IHP).

== History ==
=== Communist era ===
IHP was founded as Institut für Halbleiterphysik (tr. Institute for Semiconductor Physics), on December 22, 1983, from the research part of its parent organization, Halbleiterwerk Frankfurt (Oder) (HFO, tr. "Semiconductor Factory in Frankfurt (Oder)"), then the largest IC factory in East Germany. HFO itself was founded in 1959. On the eve of reunification the plant had 8000 employees.

=== After German reunification in 1990 ===
After German reunification, HFO lost its customer base in the Soviet bloc. Efforts were made to adapt, but it shrank from 8,000 to 100 people and finally closed in July 2002. However, IHP remained healthy and continued to receive research funding and to develop new technology. It received an English name Innovations for High Performance Microelectronics and kept the original initialism. Its staff won patents for a method where carbon doping prevents performance-killing boron diffusion. The new federal government invested to bring economic development and to mitigate unemployment. IHP and Communicant became part of one such project. The Si-Ge:C technology from IHP and its productization at Communicant targeted wireless Internet applications. Investors included Intel, the Dubai Airport Free Zone Authority, and Deutsche Bank. Despite the earlier bursting of the dot.com bubble, it secured the equivalent of $325 million in private equity in April 2002. But the plan stirred controversy and acquired opponents: Infineon (which had a competing Si-Ge factory in Dresden) opposed it. In April 2003, Infineon threatened to move from Germany to Switzerland, citing high taxes. Then in December 2003, the federal loan guarantees to cover 75 percent of the project's €1.3 billion cost did not materialize and Communicant shut down with the factory unfinished.

=== Aftermath ===
Infineon stayed headquartered in Munich, Germany. The failure of the project was the topic of detailed post-mortems. In November 2006, the Hamburg-based solar energy company Conergy bought the 300,000-square-meter (74-acre) site and built a production plant for solar cells and modules. As of 2009, around 450 people were employed there in a four-shift operation.

== Literature ==
- G. Valerius: Gleiche Chancen ungleich genutzt? : erwerbsbiographische Mobilitätspfade im ostdeutschen Transformationsprozeß zwischen 1990 und 1996; Studie zum beruflichen Verbleib einer ausgewählten Ingenieurgruppe des VEB Halbleiterwerk Frankfurt (Oder). (= Arbeitsberichte. No. 98,2). FIT/ Europa-Universität Viadrina, Frankfurt (Oder) 1998, DNB-IDN 954110323.
