= Multi-leaded power package =

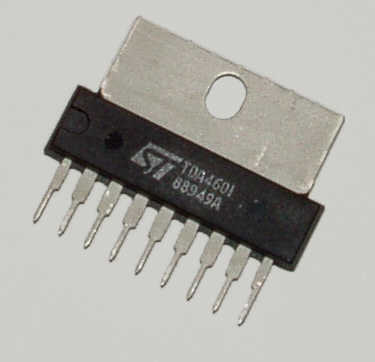
An example of a 9-lead multi-leaded power package (Single in-line package)

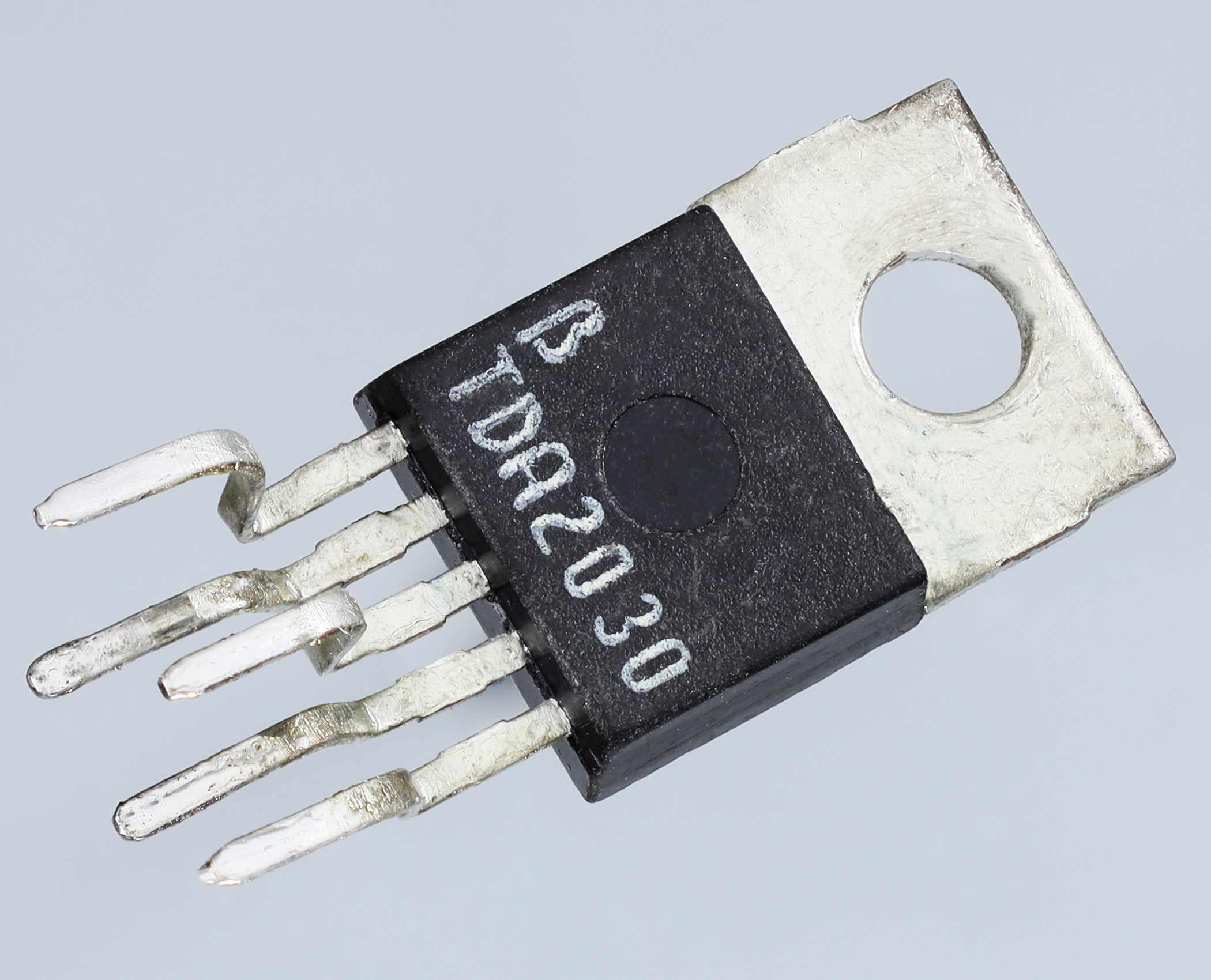
A TDA2030 audio power amplifier IC (14 Watt) in a staggerd TO-220 with five leads.

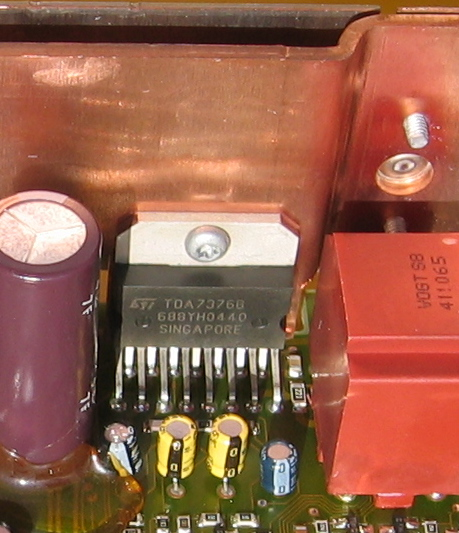
A TDA7376B audio power amplifier IC (2× 35 Watt) in a staggerd package with fifteen leads mpounted on a heatsink.

The multi-leaded power package is a style of electronic component package, commonly used for high power integrated circuits, especially for monolithic audio amplifiers. It was derived from single in-line package. The difference is the lead arrangement; multi-leaded power packages usually have the lead bent to zig-zag pattern. Multi-leaded power packages commonly have more than three leads; nine-, thirteen- and fifteen-lead units are common, units with five or seven leads with TO-220 style are also manufactured. A notable characteristic is a metal tab with a hole, used in mounting the case to a heatsink. The physical view of multi-leaded power packages are simply stretched TO-220 packages. Components made in multi-leaded power packages can handle more power than those constructed in TO-220 cases, or even TO-3 cases with thermal resistance no less than 1.5 C/W.

One well-known STMicroelectronics brand of this type of package is Multiwatt.

== Typical applications ==
Multi-leaded power packages are heatsinkable, and thus can be used in projects where a large amount of power is being drawn. The top of the package has a metal tab with a hole used in mounting the component to a heatsink. Thermal compound is also used to provide greater heat transfer.

The metal tab is often connected electrically to the internal circuitry; ground and supply connections are common. This does not normally pose a problem when using isolated heatsinks, but an electrically-insulating pad or sheet may be required to electrically isolate the component from the heatsink if the heatsink is grounded or otherwise non-isolated. The material used to electrically isolate the multi-leaded power package, like mica, needs to have a high thermal conductivity.

In applications where vertical clearance is at a premium (such as ISA cards in computers), it is often feasible to bend the leads at a right angle and mount the component flat to the printed wiring board using a screw and nut. This often provides enough surface area to heatsink the component when power dissipation is moderately high.
