= MicroVAX 78032 =

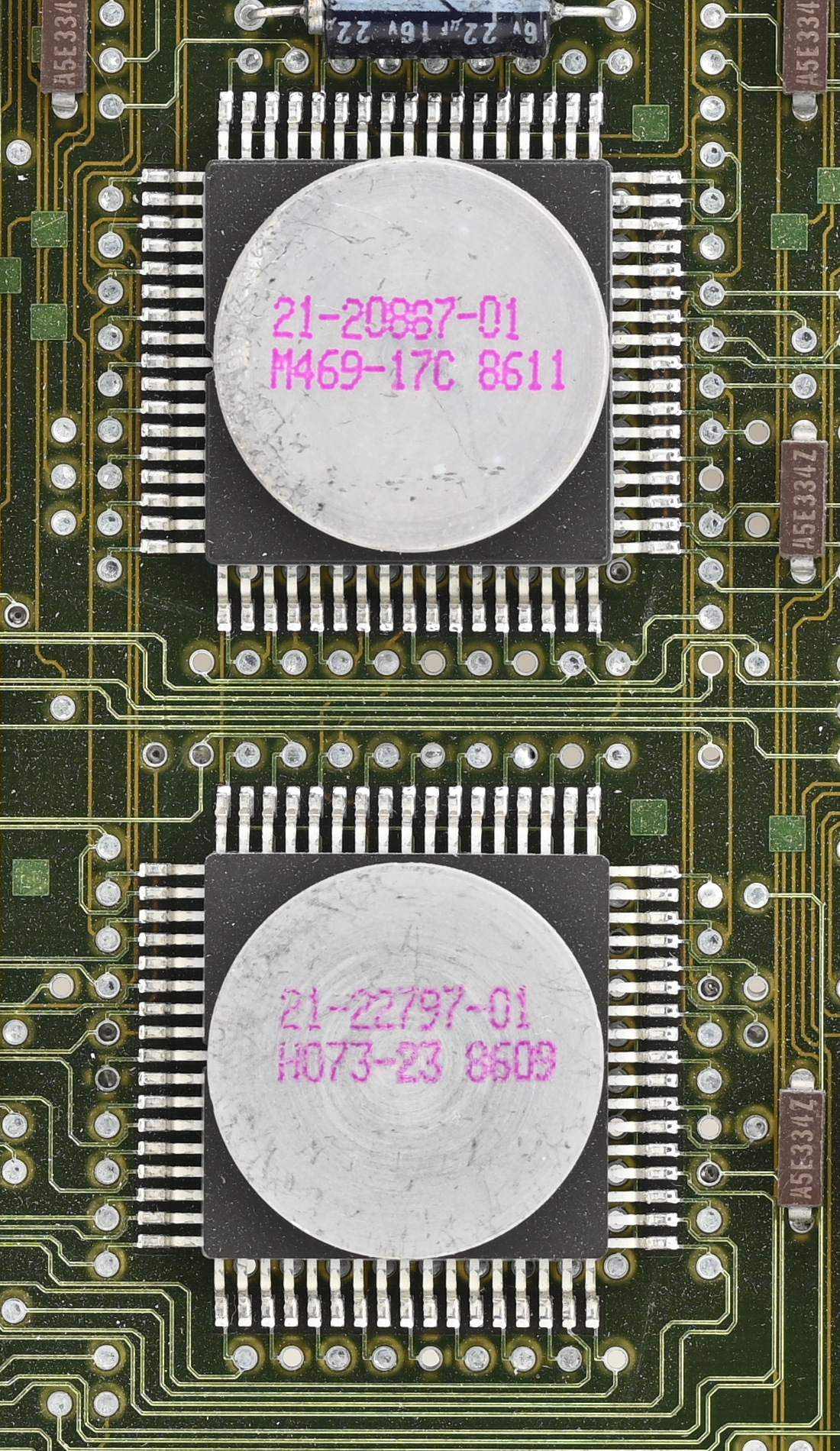
CPU 78032 (top) and FPU 78132

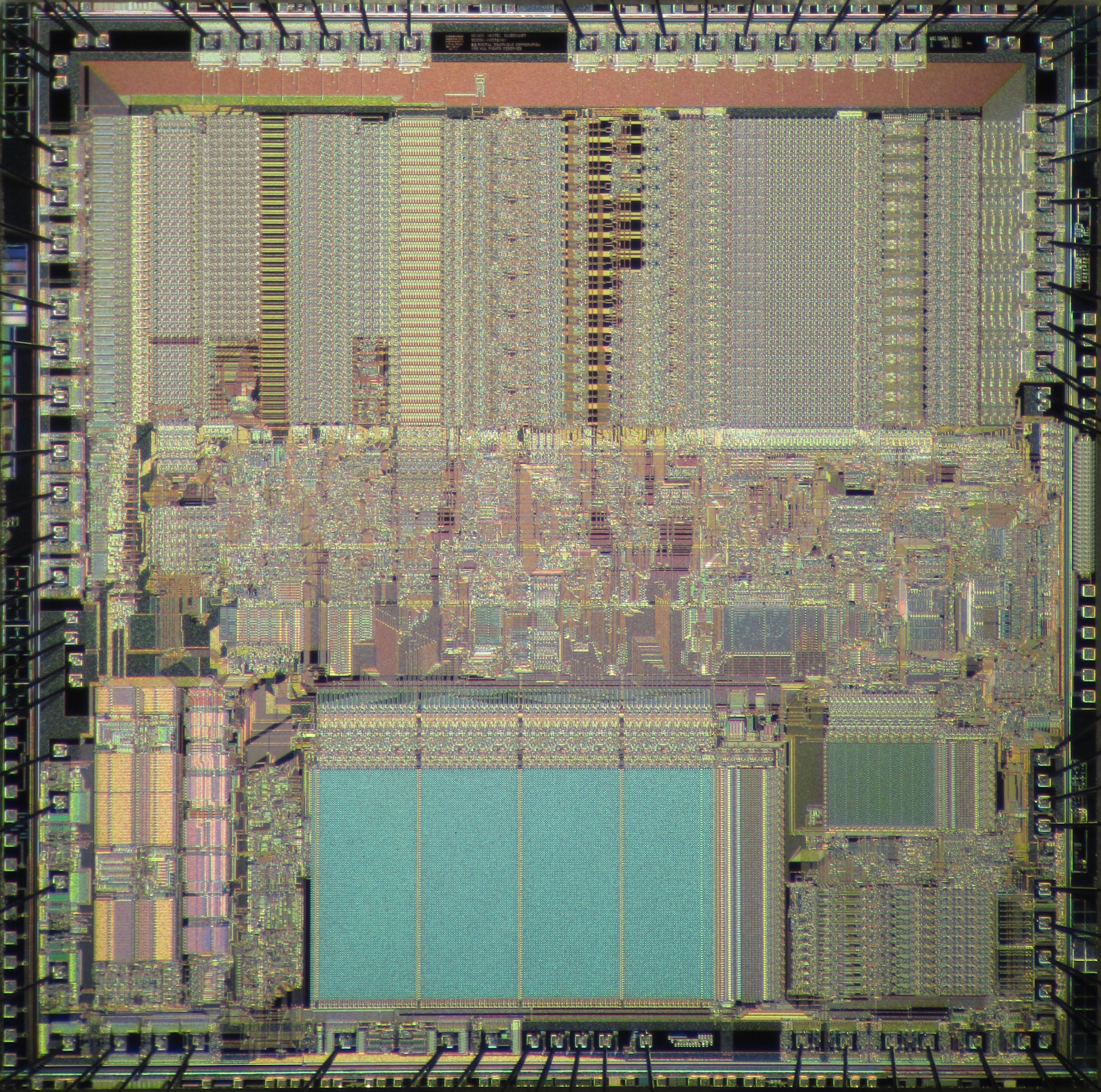
DEC MicroVAX 78032 CPU die shot

The MicroVAX 78032 (otherwise known as the DC333) is a microprocessor developed and fabricated by Digital Equipment Corporation (DEC) that implements a subset of the VAX instruction set architecture (ISA). The 78032 is used exclusively in DEC's VAX-based systems, starting with the MicroVAX II in 1985. When clocked at a frequency of 5 MHz, the 78032's integer performance is comparable to the original VAX-11/780 of 1977. The microprocessor can be paired with the MicroVAX 78132 floating point accelerator for improved floating point performance.

The 78032 represents a number of firsts for DEC. It is DEC's first single-chip microprocessor implementation of the VAX ISA and DEC's first self-fabricated microprocessor. The MicroVAX 78032 is also the first semiconductor device to be registered for protection under the Semiconductor Chip Protection Act of 1984.

The MicroVAX 78032 contains 125,000 transistors on an 8.7 by 8.6 mm (74.82 mm^{2}) die that was fabricated in DEC's ZMOS process, a 3.0 µm NMOS logic process with two layers of aluminum interconnect. The die is packaged in a 68-pin surface-mounted leaded chip carrier.

== MicroVAX 78132 ==
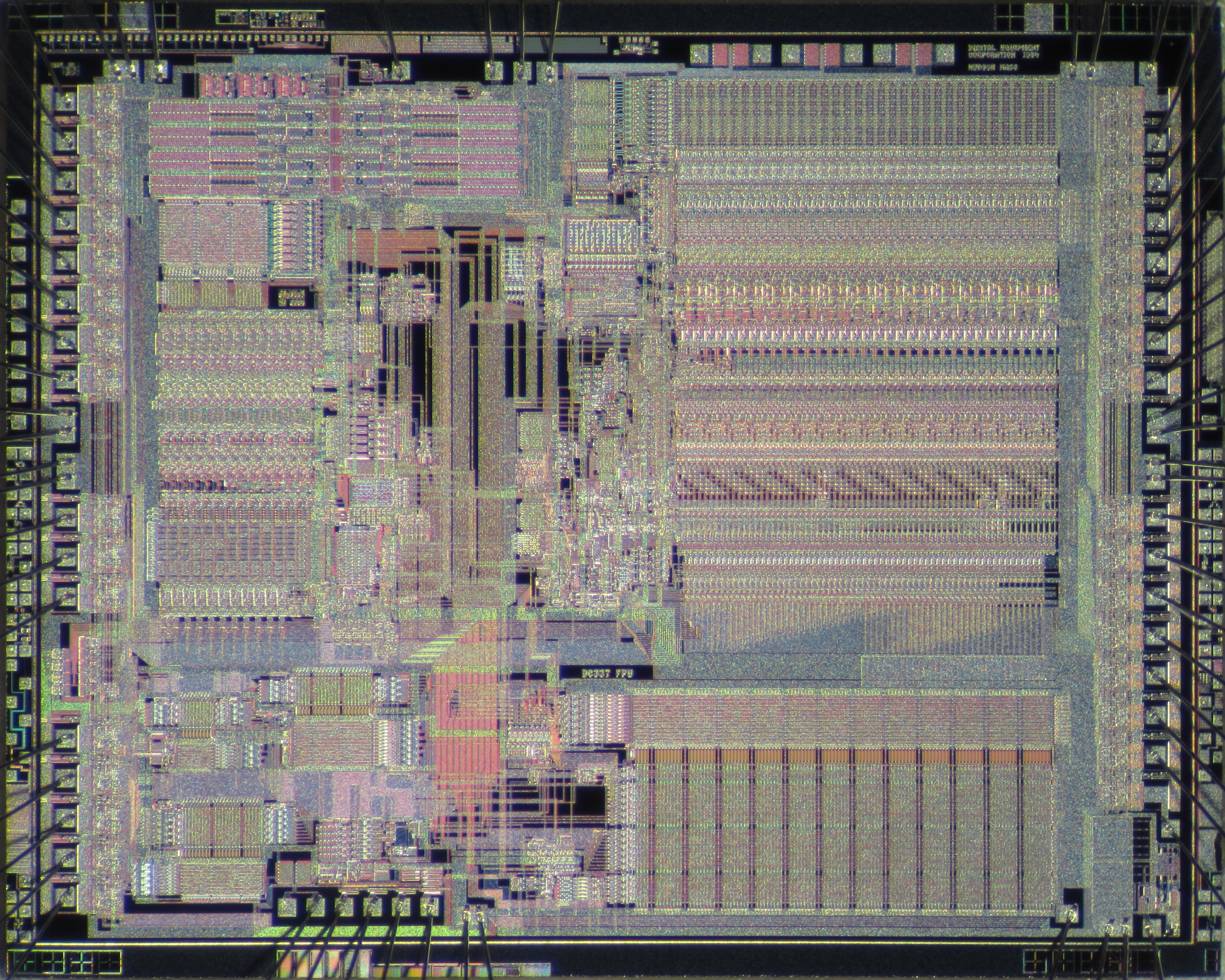
DEC MicroVAX 78132 FPU die shot

The MicroVAX 78132 (otherwise known as the DC337) is a floating-point coprocessor for the MicroVAX 78032 microprocessor. It interfaces to the MicroVAX 78032 via the DAL bus and a few control lines. The MicroVAX 78132 is responsible for executing 61 out of 70 floating-point instructions defined by the MicroVAX subset of the VAX ISA and accelerates nine integer instructions.

The MicroVAX 78132 has a 100 ns microcycle divided into four 25 ns clock phases which is generated by a 40 MHz input clock. It is composed of five "elements": a 67-bit fraction processor, a 13-bit exponent processor, a 1-bit sign processor, a microsequencer and a bus interface unit.

The MicroVAX 78132 contains 32,141 transistors on a die measuring 8.4 mm by 6.6 mm (55.44 mm^{2}). It was fabricated in DEC's ZMOS process, a 3.0 µm NMOS process with two layers of aluminum interconnect; and is packaged in a 68-pin surface-mounted leaded chip carrier.

== Other vendors ==
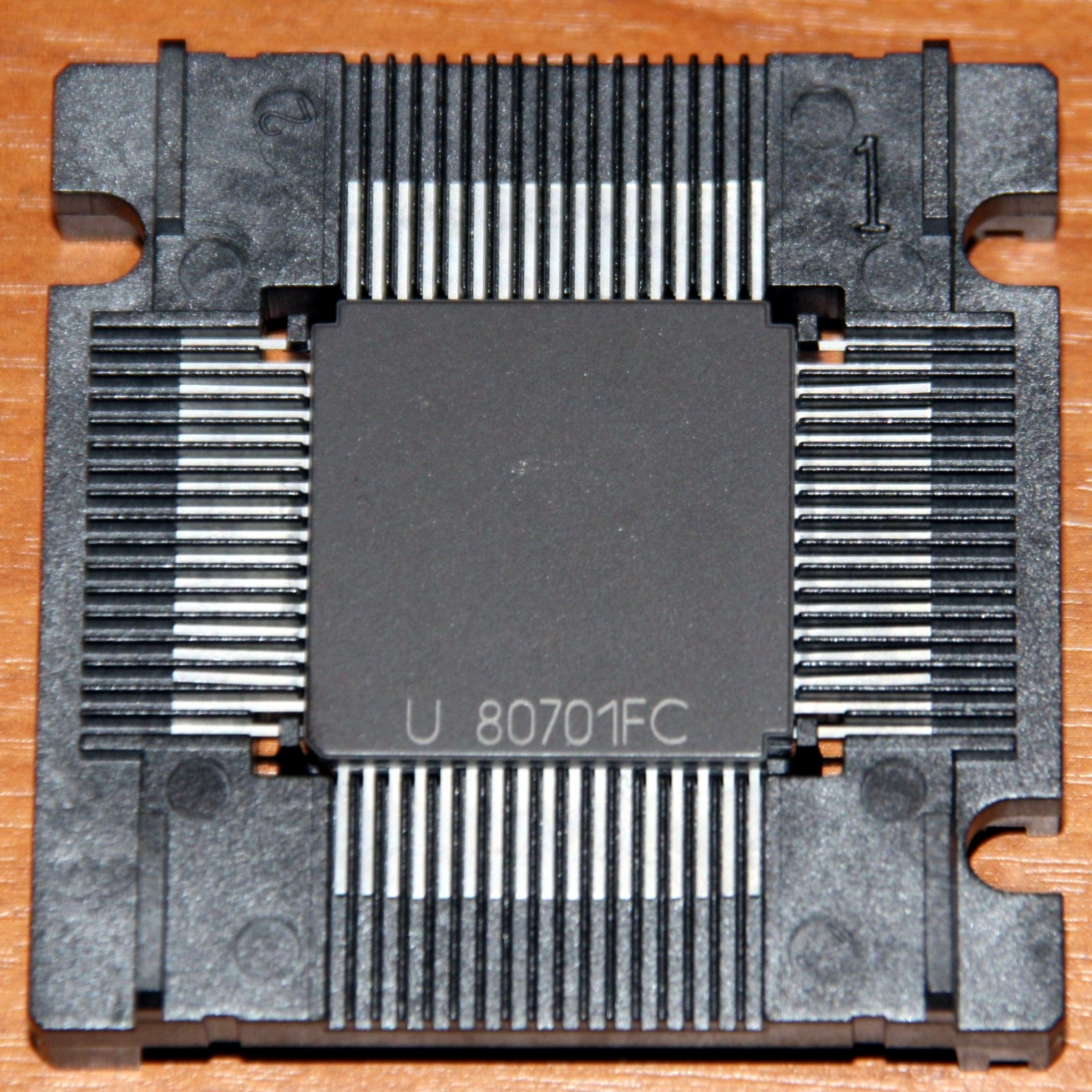
The rare U80701 was the first 32-Bit microprocessor manufactured in the GDR and is pin-compatible to DEC 78032.

An identical, reverse engineered copy of the 78032 was manufactured 1989/90 in East Germany as the U80701.

Another clone of the 78032 was manufactured in the Soviet Union under the designation KL1807VM3 (Russian: КЛ1807ВМ3).
