= Standard Disk Interconnect =

The Standard Disk Interconnect (SDI, sometimes Standard Disk Interface) was used by Digital Equipment Corporation for its line of RAxx disks, for example the RA90. There were two bi-directional serial communications paths between the controller and the drive. One path was for messages (from the controller to the drive) and responses (from the drive to the controller); messages controlled seeking, setting drive parameters, reporting errors, etc. This path was also used to transmit data to and from the drive. The other path consisted of a continuously transmitted set of control (controller-to-drive) or status (drive-to-controller) bits. There were about 6 bits in each direction, and they served the same purpose as having six dedicated lines in each direction.

By encoding control signals serially they could be AC-coupled (with a transformer) to prevent ground loop problems and EMI issues between the controller and the drives, which could be connected by long cables, even to different floors in a building. The same serial interconnect was used for tape and solid state storage devices to the storage subsystem controllers. Large VAX systems primarily used the Hierarchical Storage Controller (HSC) series but Unibus and BI Bus controllers to SDI were built as well. The UDA50 for the Unibus was the first controller shipped with the SDI interface.

Among the signals the drive sent to the controller were:

- Index Pulse - the drive head is over the beginning of sector 0 of the track.
- Sector Pulse - the drive head is over the beginning of some other sector. The controller counted these pulses to know where the drive was, rotationally.
- Read/Write Ready - the drive head has settled over some track, and it is safe to read or write.

The controller signals to the drive included signals such as Read Gate (turn the Read Head on) and Write Gate (turn the Write Head on).

The data transfer could be over a wide range of bit rates as the system was self clocked. This enabled multiple generations of disk technology to use the SDI, as well as other storage devices.

The SDI was an element of the Digital Storage Architecture (DSA) which included the Mass Storage Control Protocol (MSCP), which specified communications means between OS software and all flavors of storage devices.
