= VAX-11 =

Family of superminicomputers by Digital

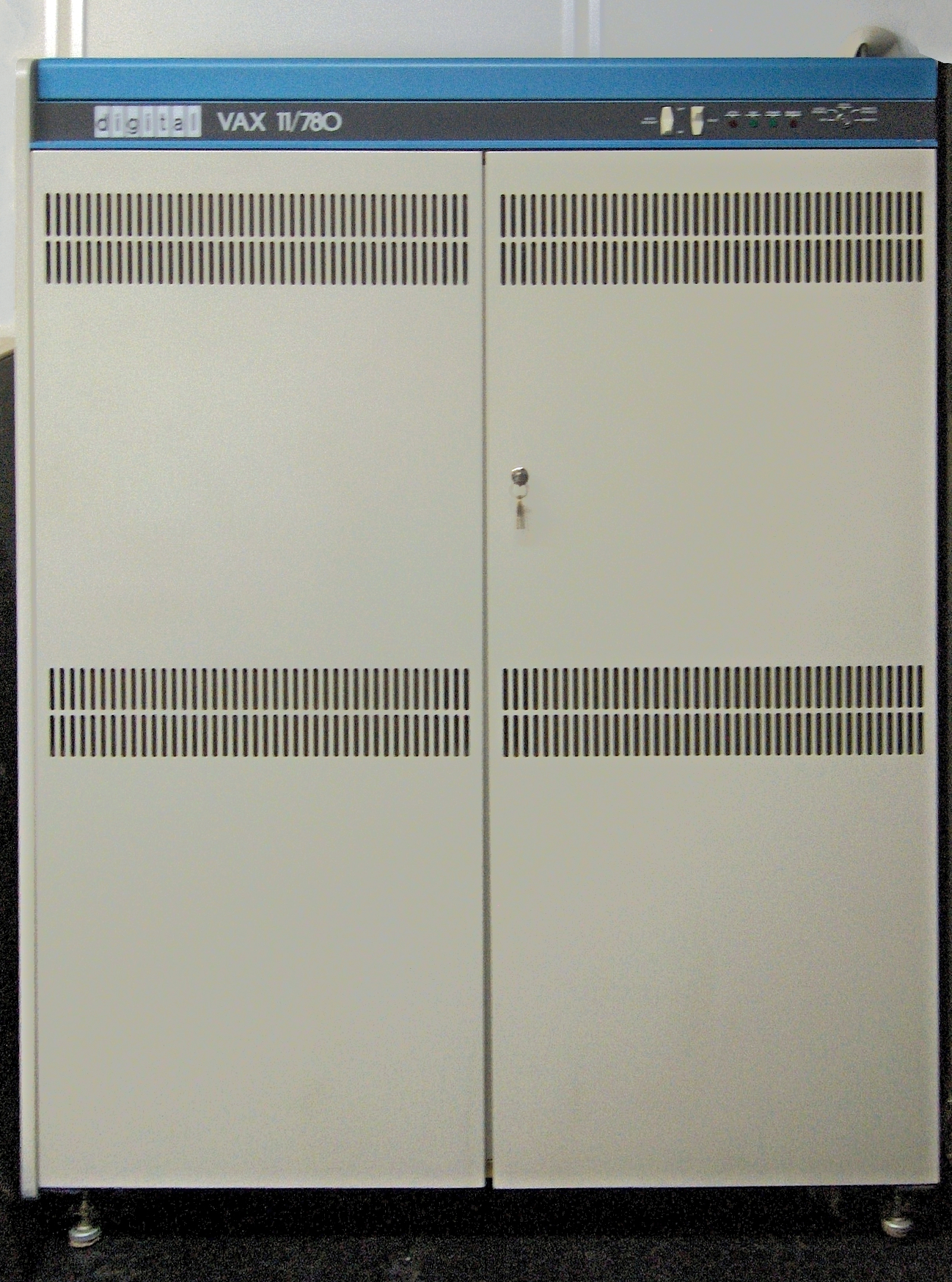
A VAX-11/780

The VAX-11 is a discontinued family of 32-bit superminicomputers, running the Virtual Address eXtension (VAX) instruction set architecture (ISA), developed and manufactured by Digital Equipment Corporation (DEC). Development began in 1976. In addition to being powerful machines in their own right, they also offer the additional ability to run user mode PDP-11 code (thus the -11 in VAX-11), offering an upward compatible path for existing customers.

The first machine in the series, the VAX-11/780, was announced in October 1977. Its former competitors in the minicomputer space, like Data General and Hewlett-Packard, were unable to successfully respond to the introduction and rapid update of the VAX design. DEC followed the VAX-11/780 with the lower-cost 11/750, and the even lower cost 11/730 and 11/725 models in 1982. More powerful models, initially known as the VAX-11/790 and VAX-11/795, were instead rebranded as the VAX 8600 series.

The VAX-11 line was discontinued in 1988, having been supplanted by the MicroVAX family on the low end, and the VAX 8000 family on the high end. The VAX-11/780 is historically one of the most successful and studied computers in history.

== VAX-11/780 ==
VAX-11 registers

^{3}_{1}	...	^{2}_{3}	...	^{1}_{5}	...	^{0}_{7}	^{0}_{6}	^{0}_{5}	^{0}_{4}	^{0}_{3}	^{0}_{2}	^{0}_{1}	^{0}_{0}	(bit position)
General registers
R0														Register 0
R1														Register 1
R2														Register 2
R3														Register 3
R4														Register 4
R5														Register 5
R6														Register 6
R7														Register 7
R8														Register 8
R9														Register 9
R10														Register 10
R11														Register 11
Index registers
R12 / AP														Register 12 / Argument Pointer
R13 / FP														Register 13 / Frame Pointer
R14 / SP														Register 14 / Stack Pointer
Program counter
R15 / PC														Register 15 / Program Counter
Status flags
							I			V	N	Z	C	Processor Status Word
														Floating Point Status Register

The VAX-11/780, code-named "Star", was introduced on 25 October 1977 at DEC's Annual Meeting of Shareholders. It is the first computer to implement the VAX architecture. The KA780 central processing unit (CPU) is built from Schottky transistor-transistor logic (TTL) devices and has a 200 ns cycle time (5 MHz) and a 2 KB cache. Memory and I/O are accessed via the Synchronous Backplane Interconnect (SBI).

The CPU is microprogrammed, with the microcode stored in a combination of PROM control store and writable control store. The writable control store is loaded at boot time from an 8" floppy disk controlled by a front-end processor, an LSI-11, which is used to run local and remote diagnostics.

The VAX-11/780 originally supported up to 8MB of memory through one or two MS780-C memory controllers, with each controller supporting between 128KB-4MB of memory. The later MS780-E memory controller supports 4MB-64MB of memory, allowing the VAX-11/780 to support up to a total of 128MB of memory. The KA780 has a 29-bit physical address space, allowing it to address a theoretical maximum of 512MB of memory. The memory is constructed from 4 or 16 kbit metal oxide semiconductor (MOS) RAM chips mounted on memory array cards. Each memory controller controls up to 16 array cards. The memory is protected by error correcting code (ECC).

The VAX-11/780 uses the Unibus and Massbus for I/O. Unibus is used for attaching lower-speed peripherals such as terminals and printers and Massbus for higher-speed disk and tape drives. After the introduction of the RA series drives in December 1982 the Unibus was also used for high-speed peripherals. Both buses are provided by adapters that interface the bus to the SBI. All systems come with one Unibus as standard, with up to four supported. Massbus is optional, with up to four supported. The VAX-11/780 also supports Computer Interconnect (CI), a proprietary network to attach disk drives and potentially share them with other VAX computers. This feature can connect VAX computers in a VMScluster.

Digital used the performance of the VAX-11/780 as a reference point for describing the performance of subsequent VAX models. The performance of the VAX-11/780 became known as 1 VAX Unit of Performance (or 1.0 VUPs). Other VAX models are rated as a multiple of the VAX-11/780's performance, for example, a 2.0 VUPs VAX is twice as fast as the VAX-11/780.

=== VAX-11/782 ===
The VAX-11/782, code-named "Atlas", is a dual-processor VAX-11/780 introduced in 1982. Both processors share the same MA780 multiport memory bus and the system operates asymmetrically, with the primary CPU performing all I/O operations and process scheduling with the second, attached processor only used for additional computationally intensive work. For multistream computation-intensive tasks the system delivers up to 1.8 times the performance of a VAX 11/780.

This model is essentially a copy of the "dual VAX-11/780" computers hand built by wire-wrapping the backplanes of two VAX-11/780 CPUs by then graduate student George H. Goble and undergraduate assistants at Purdue University as part of his work on his master's degree thesis on modifications of the Unix kernel for multi-CPU architecture.

=== VAX-11/784 ===
The VAX-11/784, code-named "VAXimus", is a rare quad-processor variant of the VAX-11/780. Similar to the VAX-11/782, it is an asymmetric multiprocessing system, with all four KA780 processors sharing the same MA780 multiport memory bus. Its performance is rated as 3.5 VUPs. Avie Tevanian, a founder of the Mach project, stated that he used a VAX-11/784 to run early versions of the Mach kernel.

=== VAX-11/785 ===
The VAX-11/785, code-named "Superstar", was introduced in April 1984. Its KA785 CPU is essentially a faster KA780, with a CPU cycle time of 133 ns (7.52 MHz) versus the 200 ns (5 MHz) CPU cycle time of the KA780, giving a performance of 1.5 VUPs. The decrease in CPU cycle time is accomplished through use of Fairchild Advanced Schottky TTL (FAST) logic.

=== VAX-11/787 ===
The VAX-11/787 is a possible dual-processor variant of the VAX-11/785. It is unclear whether any were produced.

== VAX-11/750 ==
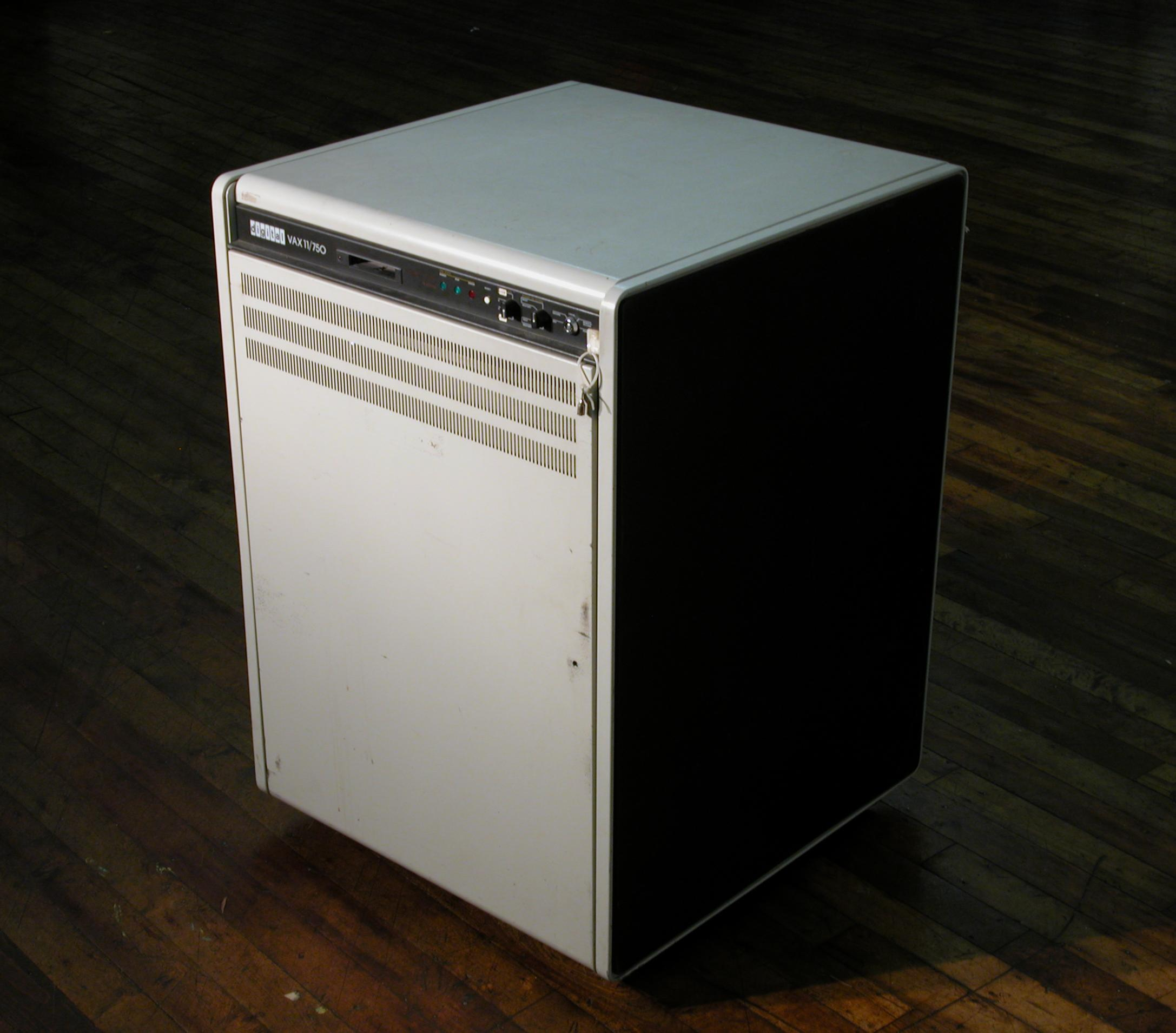
VAX-11/750

The VAX-11/750, code-named "Comet", is a more compact, lower-performance bipolar gate array–based implementation of the VAX architecture introduced in October 1980. The use of gate arrays decreases power consumption, and increases reliability compared with the VAX-11/780. The KA750 CPU has a 320 ns cycle time (3.125 MHz), and a VUPs rating of 0.6. The system can support up to 2MB of memory with an L0011 memory controller, up to 8MB with an L0016 memory controller, or up to 14MB with an L0022 memory controller.

While the 11/780 boots from a 8” floppy via its console processor, the VAX 11/750 is equipped with a TU58 (DECtape II) cassette drive for first level booting and diagnostics.

=== VAX-11/751 ===
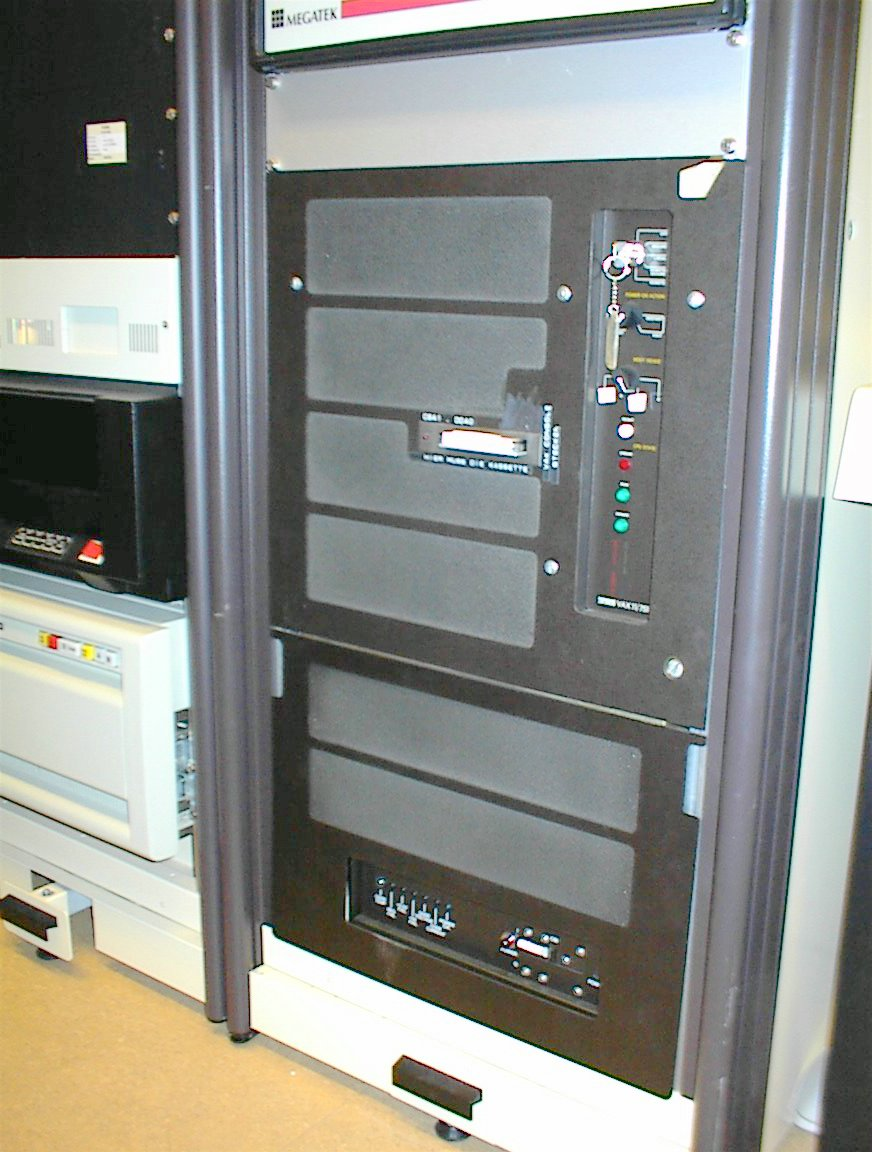
VAX-11/751

A ruggedized rack-mount VAX-11/750.

== VAX-11/730 ==
Introduced in April 1982, the VAX-11/730, code-named "Nebula", is a still-more-compact, still-lower-performance bit slice implementation of the VAX architecture using AMD Am2900 chips for the CPU. The KA730 CPU has a 270 ns cycle time (3.70 MHz), and a VUPs rating of 0.3. It supports up to 5MB of memory.

=== VAX-11/725 ===
Code-named "LCN" ("Low-Cost Nebula"), it is a cost-reduced model of the VAX-11/730. It uses the same KA730 CPU as the VAX-11/730, but is housed in a more compact enclosure designed to reduce noise and heat ("55 dB" and "575 W (max.)"), making it more suitable for use in an office environment. It supports up to 3MB of memory.

== VAX-11/790 and VAX-11/795 ==
The VAX-11/790 and VAX-11/795 are the original names for the VAX 8600 and VAX 8650 respectively.

== Remaining machines ==
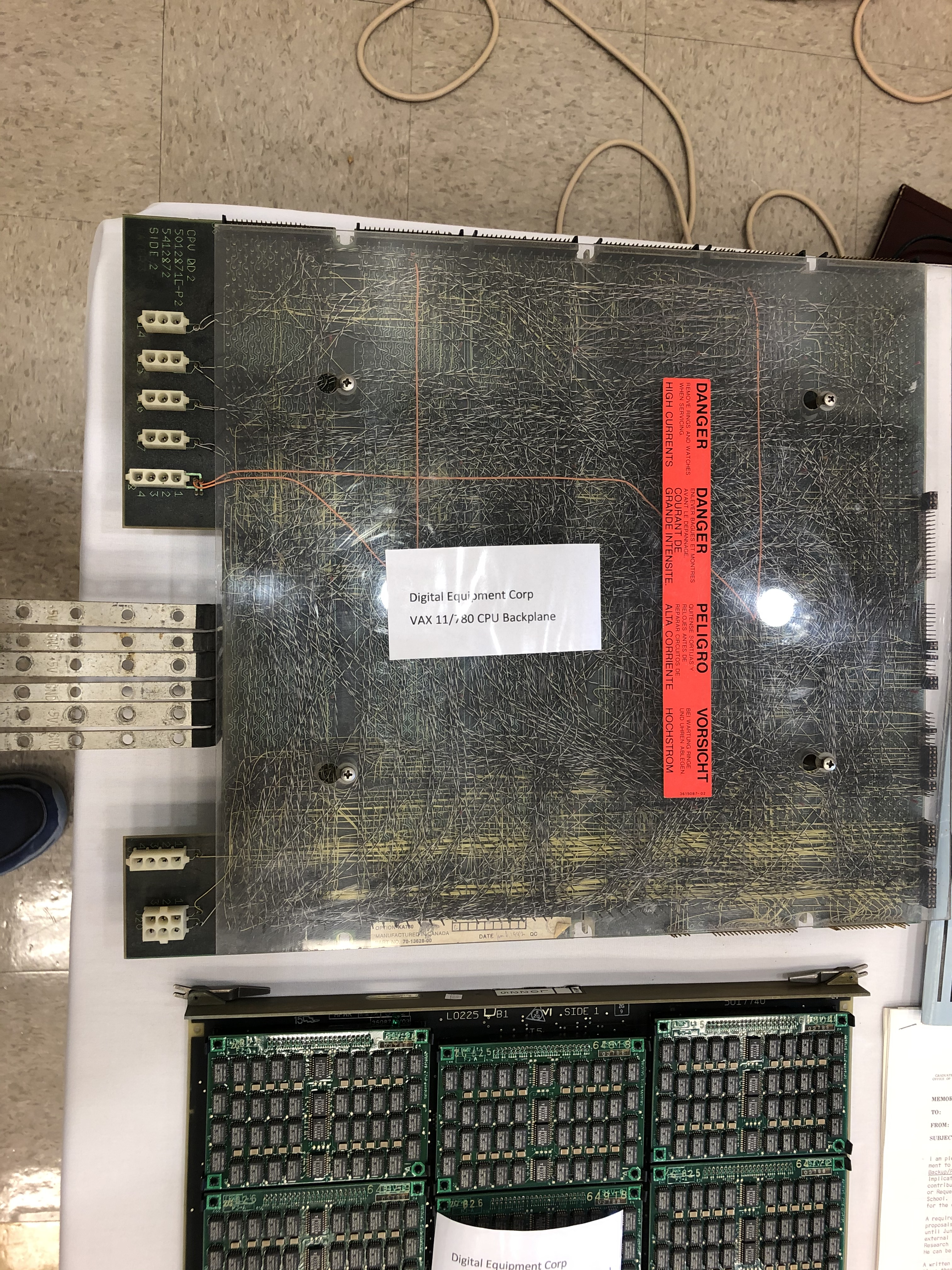
A VAX-11/780 CPU backplane

- The Living Computer Museum of Seattle, Washington maintained a VAX-11/780-5 (field-upgraded VAX-11/780) running OpenVMS 7.3. The museum has now closed permanently.
- The Computer History Museum of Mountain View, California has three VAX-11/780 systems, one VAX-11/725, one VAX-11/730, and one VAX-11/750 within its permanent collection.
- The RECHENWERK Computer & Technikmuseum Halle in Halle, Germany holds a VAX-11/730 and a very rare East German clone of a VAX-11/780 named Robotron K 1840 in its permanent exhibition.
- The Verde Binario retrocomputing association has a VAX-11/780 to which they dedicated a calendar.
- The Large Scale Systems Museum in New Kensington, Pennsylvania has VAX-11/785, VAX-11/780, VAX-11/750, and VAX-11/730 systems.
- The Luddy School of Informatics, Computing, and Engineering at Indiana University Bloomington has on display a VAX-11/780, as well as various other computers from the time.
- The Museum of Batch and Time-sharing Computer History (MoBATCH) of Lafayette, Indiana has a VAX-11/780 running 4.3BSD, which has been used in video production, and displayed at events.
