= TU81 =

The TU81 was a dual-density, 9-track, ANSI standard 1/2-inch magnetic tape subsystem built and sold by Digital Equipment Corporation. The tape drive appeared under TU81, TU81 Plus, and TA81 model designations. The main difference between the TU81 and TA81 models was the communications interface. The TU81 Plus included a 256Kb cache to improve performance.

== General specifications ==
Capacity (732 meter/2400 foot tape):

      1600 bits/inch: 40 MB
      6250 bits/inch: 140 MB

Data Transfer Rate: 40 kB/s to 469 kB/s

Speed:

      Low Speed, Start/Stop: 63.5 cm/s (24 in/s)
      Low Speed, Streaming:  63.5 cm/s (24 in/s)
      High Speed, Streaming: 190.5 cm/s (75 in/s)

== Model-specific specifications ==
=== TU-81 ===
Interface: Unibus

=== TU-81 Plus ===
Interface: Unibus, BI-Bus, Q22-Bus

=== TA81 ===
Interface: HSC

== Sources ==
- TU81/TA81 and TU81 Plus Subsystem User's Guide
