= List of VAX computers =

Between 1977 and 2000, Digital Equipment Corporation (DEC) produced a wide range of computer systems under the VAX brand, all based on various implementations of the DEC-proprietary instruction set architecture of the same name.

== VAX-11 ==
Models in the VAX-11/7xx series include:

- VAX-11/780
- VAX-11/750
- VAX-11/751
- VAX-11/730
- VAX-11/782
- VAX-11/784
- VAX-11/785
- VAX-11/787
- VAX-11/788
- VAX-11/725

== VAX 8000 ==
- VAX 8600
- VAX 8650
- VAX 8x00
- VAX 8500
- VAX 8530
- VAX 8550
- VAX 8700
- VAX 8800
- VAX 8810/8820/8830/8840
- VAX 8974
- VAX 8978

== MicroVAX ==
- MicroVAX I
- MicroVAX II
- Industrial VAX 630
- MicroVAX III
- MicroVAX III+
- VAX 4
- MicroVAX 2000
- MicroVAX 3100 Model 10
- MicroVAX 3100 Model 10e
- MicroVAX 3100 Model 20 (also sold with different firmware as an Infoserver 100)
- MicroVAX 3100 Model 20e
- MicroVAX 3100 Model 30
- MicroVAX 3100 Model 40
- MicroVAX 3100 Model 80
- MicroVAX 3100 Model 85
- MicroVAX 3100 Model 88
- MicroVAX 3100 Model 90
- MicroVAX 3100 Model 95
- MicroVAX 3100 Model 96
- MicroVAX 3100 Model 98
- MicroVAX 3300
- MicroVAX 3400
- MicroVAX 3500
- MicroVAX 3600
- MicroVAX 3800
- MicroVAX 3900

== VAXserver ==
- VAXserver 3000
- VAXserver 3100
- VAXserver 3300
- VAXserver 3400
- VAXserver 3500
- VAXserver 3600
- VAXserver 3602
- VAXserver 3800
- VAXserver 3900
- VAXserver 4000 Model 200
- VAXserver 4000 Model 300
- VAXserver 6000 Model 210
- VAXserver 6000 Model 220
- VAXserver 6000 Model 310
- VAXserver 6000 Model 320
- VAXserver 6000 Model 410
- VAXserver 6000 Model 420
- VAXserver 6000 Model 510
- VAXserver 6000 Model 520
- VAXserver 9000 Model 110
- VAXserver 9000 Model 3x0
- VAXserver 9000 Model 310/Model 310VP
- VAXserver 9000 Model 320/Model 320VP
- VAXserver 9000 Model 330/Model 330VP
- VAXserver 9000 Model 340/Model 340VP

== VAXstation ==
- VAXstation I
- VAXstation II
- VAXstation II/GPX
- VAXstation 2000
- VAXstation 3100 Model 30
- VAXstation 3100 Model 38
- VAXstation 3100 Model 40
- VAXstation 3100 Model 48
- VAXstation 3100 Model 76
- VAXstation 3200
- VAXstation 3500
- VAXstation 3520
- VAXstation 3540
- VAXstation 4000 Model 30 (VAXstation 4000 VLC)
- VAXstation 4000 Model 60
- VAXstation 4000 Model 90
- VAXstation 4000 Model 90A
- VAXstation 4000 Model 96
- VAXstation 8000
- VT1300
- VXT 2000

== VAX 6000 ==
- VAX 6000 Model 2x0 (also known as the VAX 62x0)
- VAX 6000 Model 3x0 (also known as the VAX 63x0)
- VAX 6333
- VAX 6000 Model 4x0
- VAX 6000 Model 5x0
- VAX 6000 Model 6x0

== VAX 4000 ==
- VAX 4000 Model 50
- VAX 4000 Model 100
- VAX 4000 Model 100A
- VAX 4000 Model 105A
- VAX 4000 Model 106A
- VAX 4000 Model 108
- VAX 4000 Model 200
- VAX 4000 Model 300
- VAX 4000 Model 400
- VAX 4000 Model 500
- VAX 4000 Model 500A
- VAX 4000 Model 505A
- VAX 4000 Model 600
- VAX 4000 Model 600A
- VAX 4000 Model 700A
- VAX 4000 Model 705A

== VAX 9000 ==
- VAX 9000 Model 110
- VAX 9000 Model 210
- VAX 9000 Model 210VP
- VAX 9000 Model 310
- VAX 9000 Model 410
- VAX 9000 Model 420
- VAX 9000 Model 430
- VAX 9000 Model 440

== VAXft ==
- VAXft Model 310 (also known as the VAXft 3000 Model 310)
- VAXft Model 110
- VAXft Model 410
- VAXft Model 610
- VAXft Model 612
- VAXft Model 810
- VAXft 110 Server
- VAXft 310 Server
- VAXft 410 Server
- VAXft 610 Server

== VAX 7000 ==
- VAX 7000 Model 600
- VAX 7000 Model 700
- VAX 7000 Model 800

== VAX 10000 ==
- VAX 10000 Model 600
