= SBI =

SBI may refer to:

- Sambailo Airport, Guinea (by IATA code)
- SBI Group, a financial services company of Japan
- School of Business Informatics of the Virtual Global University
- Secure Border Initiative, a program in the United States
- Site of Biological Importance, a designation used locally in England for valued sites of biological diversity
- Soldier Boy I, a fictional superhero in The Boys franchise
- Somaliland Beverage Industries, a group of companies in Somaliland
- South Bend International Airport, an airport serving South Bend, Indiana, US
- Space-Based Interceptor, a project of the Strategic Defense Initiative
- State Bank of India, largest bank of India with a multinational presence
- State bureau of investigation, a state-level detective agency in the United States
- Super Bowl I
- Surabaya Pasar Turi railway station, Surabaya, East Java, Indonesia (station code: SBI)
- Sweet Baby Inc., a Canadian narrative development and consultation studio
- Synchronous Backplane Interconnect, a computer bus used by early VAX computers
- North Carolina State Bureau of Investigation
- Surrounded By Idiots, a defunct hip-hop group that included Timbaland and Pharrell Williams

== See also ==
- Single Scope Background Investigation
