= IBM System/370 Model 168 =

Discontinued mainframe computer system

- Manufacturer: International Business Machines Corporation (IBM)
- Product family: System/370
- Released: August 2, 1972
- Discontinued: September 15, 1980
- Memory: up to eight megabytes of integrated monolithic processor storage

The IBM System/370 Model 168 and Model 158 were both announced on August 2, 1972. Prior 370 systems had not "offered virtual storage capability, which was to be a hallmark of the 370 line," and some said that the 168 and 158 were the first "real 370" products. By contrast, "in 1972, the System/370 Advanced Function was released and had new Address Relocation Hardware and now supported four new operating systems (VM/370, DOS/VS, OS/VS1, OS/VS2)."

The 158 and 168 were withdrawn on September 15, 1980.

== Features ==
=== Main memory ===
Main memory, which was four-way doubleword interleaved, could be 1 to 8 megabytes, with offerings selectable in increments of one megabyte.

The Model 168 used semiconductor memory, rather than the magnetic-core memory used by the 370/165 introduced 2 years prior, resulting in a system that was faster and physically smaller than a Model 165.

=== System console ===
The newly introduced IBM 3066 Model 2 System console, as with the 165's Model 1

- replaced "most switch, pushbutton, and indicator functions" (Note: among the few retained: "system clear" and "cooling reset alarm")
- had a microfiche document viewer, (Note: the online manual has an extra dot: "d.ocument") a feature introduced for the 360/85's console. (Note: the 360/85 article includes a photo of same)

A console printer (up to 85 characters per second) to provide hard copy was optional when the console was in display mode, and required when it was in printer-keyboard mode.

=== Disk storage ===
The newly introduced Model 11 of IBM's 3330 family of disk drives, featuring removable disk packs, has double the capacity of the prior 100-megabyte offerings. (Note: It has the same number of platters but double the number of data cylinders.) (Note: Similar to the Massbus / DEC RP05/RP06 100 MB/200 MB capacities and number of cylinders.) It can't be attached to a 370/165.

=== Multiprocessing ===
Both the 370/168 and the 370/158 had MP (multiprocessing) models that offered "tightly coupled multiprocessing.

The 168 was described as having "two types of multiprocessing support" since it also offered attaching a second processing unit, an IBM 3062 Attached Processing Unit, which lacked access to Input/Output channels.

=== Extended precision floating-point ===
This feature adds support for 128-bit "hexadecimal" floating-point operands. It is standard on all 165 and 168 models, and is an "Optional (no-charge)" feature on the 370/158.

=== Emulation ===
The optional IBM 7070/7074 Compatibility Feature allowed the 168 to "run 7070 and 7074 programs at speeds that, in general, equal or exceed those of the original systems" and yet "not affect normal operation of System/370."

Other listed options are:

- 7080 Compatibility
- 709/7090/7094 II Compatibility

There is a limitation, however, described as:
"Note: Compatibility features are mutually exclusive."

=== System/370 Extended Facility ===
This optional facility of the 168-3 provides support for MVS/System Extensions (MVS/SE) and for the later MVS/System Product (MVS/SP).

== 168-1 & 168-3 ==
The Third (June 1975) edition of IBM's 168 Guide introduced the 168-3.
"There are two versions of the Model 168: the Model 1 and the Model 3."

IBM referred to the System/370 Model 168-3 as "the company's previous flagship" when comparing it and the then-new IBM 3033.

The 168-3 CPU's internal performance has been described as 5–13% faster than the 168-1.

== See also ==
- List of IBM products
- IBM System/360
- IBM System/370
