= RA90 =

The RA90 disk drive was the first Digital Equipment Corporation drive to be based on "thin film" technology. Prior to the RA90 all Digital disk drives used "oxide" disks, which were an aluminum disk coated with a polyurethane binder resin containing gamma ferric oxide particles as the recording medium. The 1988-released RA90, which held 1.2GB, was used with controllers implementing the Mass Storage Control Protocol.

== Overview ==
The RA90 disk drive, in addition to being DEC's first step into thin film technology, also introduced another first for DEC": Storage Arrays. Their first was the SA600 Storage Array, which had 4 or 8 drives. Other models were the SA550 and SA650 Mixed Storage Arrays, combining RA70s with RA82s (SA550) or RA90s (SA650). The SA482 used just RA82s instead of RA90s.

Replacing the 1.2GB RA90s with 1.5GB RA92s, an SA800 Storage Array held 12GB.

== History ==
The technology was pioneered by Ampex Corporation in Redwood City, California based on a slow motion and still frame video recorder the company had developed in 1967. In 1982 Ampex built a factory in San Jose, California that produced the first thin film disks. When Ampex ran into financial difficulties, the pioneer of thin film disk technology, Marv Garrison (now deceased) left Ampex to join Digital's thin film disk facility in Colorado Springs. A long debate ensued at the time as to whether the magnetic layer on thin film disks ought to be sputtered or plated. Ampex and Digital settled on plating. However, in spite of the higher capital equipment investment required by sputtering, the latter proved in the long term to be the more reliable technology and remains as the industry standard today. It took Digital a long time to achieve adequate MTBF (mean time before failure) performance standards for the RA-90, which delayed its time to market sufficiently to be undersold by competitors, who, by then, had introduced smaller form factors (smaller disks) at higher capacities and greater reliability. RA-90 drives were built at Digital's 1 million square foot (93,000 m²) facility in Colorado Springs and the disks were made in Tempe, Arizona.

== Technology ==
Thin film disks consisted of a metallic coating applied onto an aluminum substrate which had first been coated with a nickel-phosphorus alloy (non-magnetic) to add hardness to the soft aluminum substrate. The reason thin film disks could provide higher storage capacity has to do with the physics of magnetic recording. A plated or sputtered magnetic layer could be made much thinner than the coated urethane binder layer. Magnets don't like to be square, but rather rectangular. So, in the thin film one could place the magnetized domains much closer together whilst keeping the overall shape of the domain rectangular. This meant that adjacent magnetized areas of the disk surface could exist without cancelling each other out, or erasing (Note: RA90 only) the information recorded on the disk surface.

== Other RA disk drives ==
Other DEC disk drives in the RA family were: RA60 (removable), and the RA70/71/72/73/80/81/82/92 (Winchester).
