= Computer operator =

Person who oversees the running of computer systems

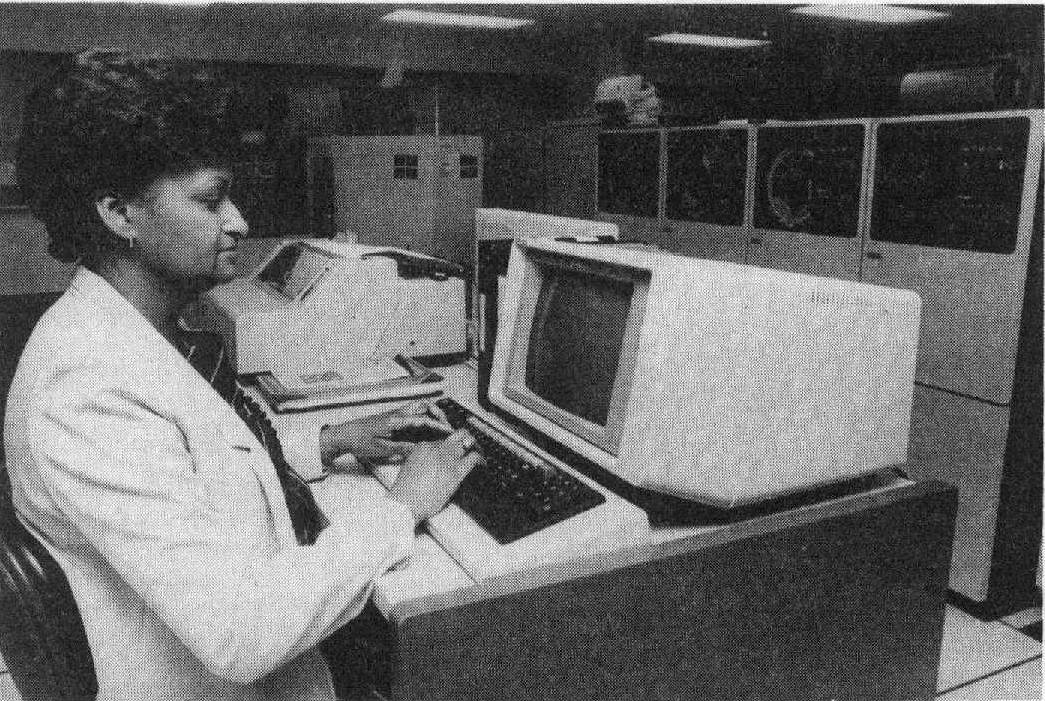
Computer operator at work with mainframe computers. (1992)

A computer operator is a role in IT which oversees the running of computer systems, ensuring that the machines, and computers are running properly. The job of a computer operator as defined by the United States Bureau of Labor Statistics is to "monitor and control ... and respond to ... enter commands ... set controls on computer and peripheral devices. This Excludes Data Entry."

== Overview ==
The position has evolved from its beginnings in the punched card era. A Bureau of Labor Statistics report published in 2018 showed that, in the public sector, a major employer of those categorized as Computer Operator was United States Postal Service. In the private sector, companies involved in data processing, hosting, or related services employed computer operators at an even higher rate. The states with the highest employment for computer operators, as of 2018, are: New York, Texas, California, New Jersey, and Florida.

== Job role description ==
The former role of a computer operator was to work with mainframe computers which required a great deal of management day-to-day including manually running batch jobs; however, now they often work with a variety of different systems and applications. The computer operator normally works in a server room or a data center, but can also work remotely so that they can operate systems across multiple sites. Most of their duties are taught on the job, as their job description will vary according to the systems they help to manage.

Responsibilities of a computer operator may include:

- Monitor and control electronic computer and peripheral electronic data processing equipment to process business, scientific, engineering, and other data according to operating instructions.
- Monitor and respond to operating and error messages.
- May enter commands at a computer terminal and set controls on computer and peripheral devices.
- Excludes "Computer Occupations" (15-1100) and "Data Entry Keyers" (43-9021).

The role also includes maintaining records and logging events, listing each backup that is run, each machine malfunction and program abnormal termination. Operators assist system administrators and programmers in testing and debugging of new systems and programs prior to their becoming production environments.

Modern-day computing has led to a greater proliferation of personal computers, with a rapid change from older mainframe systems to newer self-managing systems. This is reflected in the operator's role. Tasks may include managing the backup systems, cycling tapes or other media, filling and maintaining printers. Overall the operator fills in as a lower level system administrator or operations analyst. Most operations departments work 24x7.

A computer operator also has knowledge of disaster recovery and business continuity procedures. Formerly, this would have meant sending physical data tapes offsite, but now the data is more than likely transmitted over computer networks.

== Specializations ==
=== Console operator ===
A console operator interacts with a front panel or a multi-user system's consoles and terminals

- entering system commands via a keyboard (Note: Possibly with a pointing device, e.g., light pen, mouse)
- entering commands for a subsystem, e.g., HASP, via a keyboard
- replying to requests for information (Note: Write-to-operator (WTO) / WTOR = with Reply)
- taking actions such as mounting computer tapes that were "pulled" by a tape librarian
- supervising a tape operator, especially when there is a non-specific mount request. (Note: such as for a blank tape)
- May be limited to a specific role and only have the authority to issue commands needed for that role.

These individuals would be trained to use specialized equipment related to their duties.

=== Beyond the IBM System/360 era ===
One example of specific hardware used by a console operator is the IBM System/370 Model 158 system console, which includes a keyboard, a CRT display and a light pen Another example is the IBM 3066 Model 2 system console, similar to the console on the 360/85 (Note: Article 360/85 includes a photo of the system console.) with feature 5450, which includes a keyboard, a CRT display, a microfiche Document Viewer, an Indicator Viewer (Note: A microfiche projection display with incandescent lamps; a roller selects what background frame to project and controls what data to display with the lamps.) As with the 360/85 and 370/165, this replaces "most switch, pushbutton, and indicator functions" (Note: Among the few retained: "system clear" and "cooling reset alarm")

A console printer (up to 85 characters per second) to provide hard copy was optional when the console was in display mode, and required when it was in printer-keyboard mode.

=== Peripherals operator ===
A peripherals operator uses dedicated peripheral equipment connected to computer(s) such as printers, scanners, or storage devices for data transfer to and/or from computers.

==== Tape operator ====
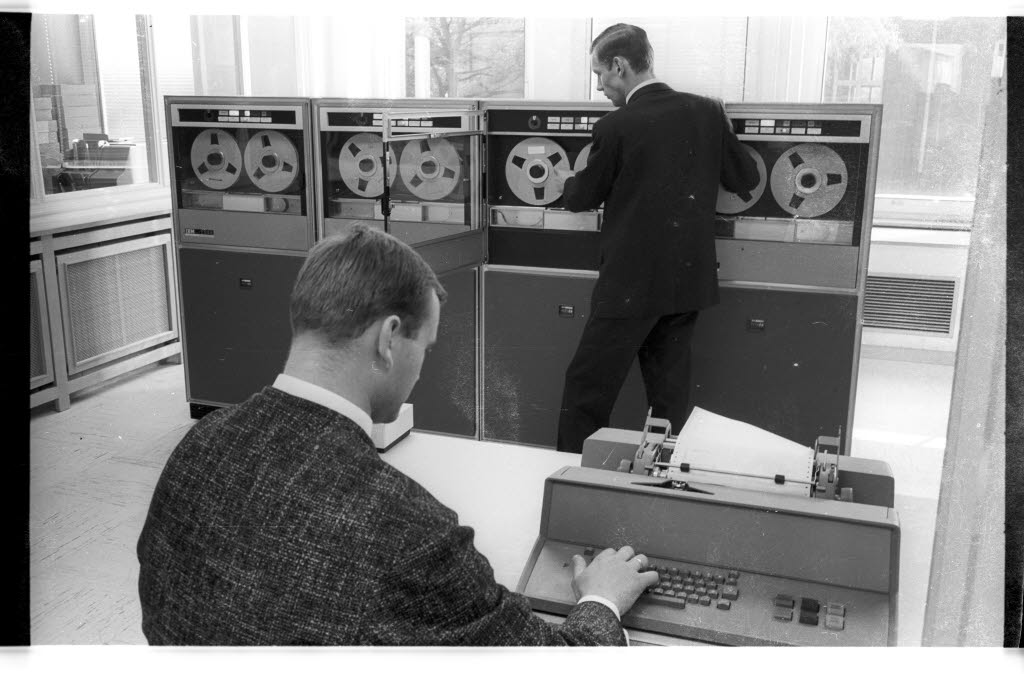
An IBM 1401 mainframe computer at Kiel municipality, 1965. Background: Computer operator replacing a tape.

Historically, tape operators were in charge of swapping out reels of paper tape, reels of magnetic tape or magnetic tape cartridges that stored computer data or instructions.

==== Card reader operator ====
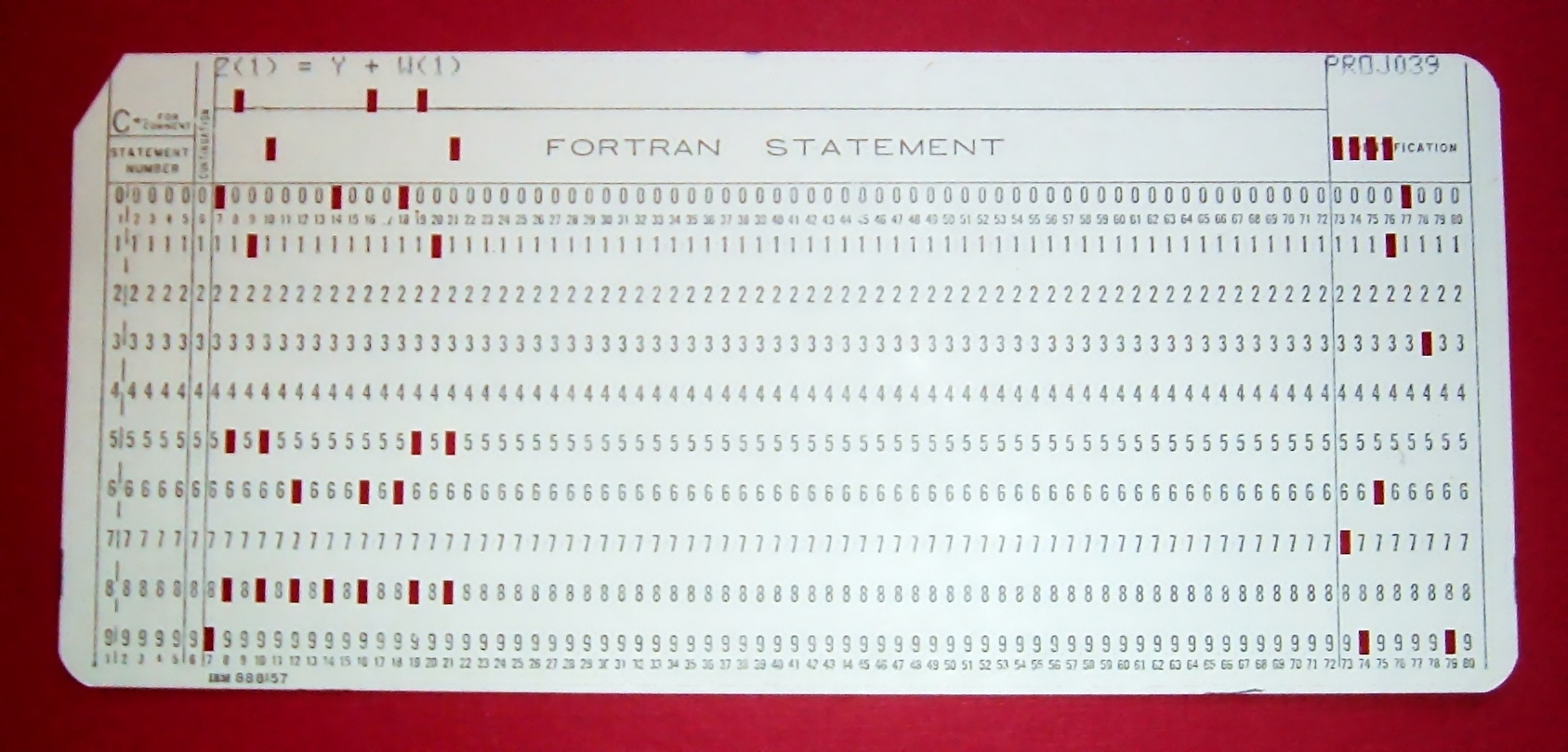
Since the rows were named 12, 11, 0, 1, 2, ... 9 the bottom of the card was called the Nine-edge, and the top was called the Twelve-edge.

Depending on the type of card reader, either the "9-edge" or the "12-edge" was towards the card reader operator inserting the cards - but the deck of cards was always placed face down.

The United States Army's wordings were:

- Load cards in hopper face down, 12 edge out, column 1 to the left (1977)
- Place cards in hopper face down with 12 edge to operator (1981)
  12 edge / face down : IBM orientation.
- nine-edge (also face down) : some other card readers.

==== Printer operator ====
In addition to filing or delivering computer printouts, a printer operator at times loads standard or, as directed by a console operator or a remote console, specialized forms.

=== Tab operator ===
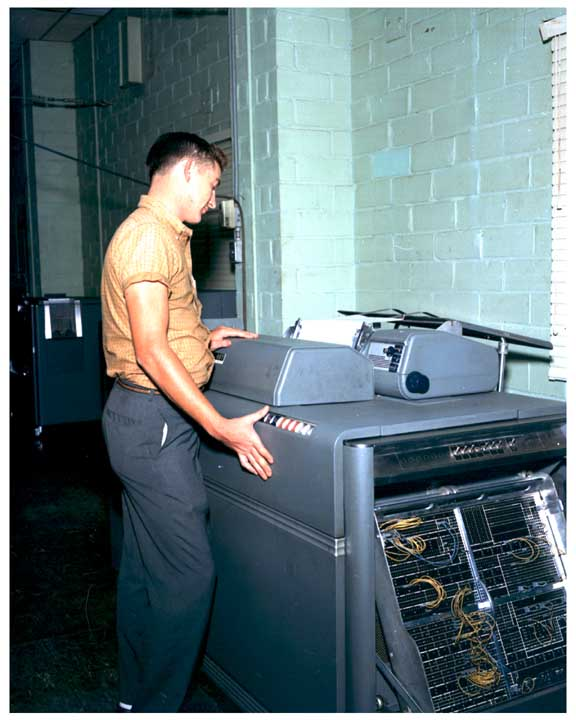
A 407 at U.S. Army's Redstone Arsenal in 1961.

The tab operator (short for tabulating) would be responsible for preparing and operating tabulating machines to produce statistical results. Hardware such as the IBM 08x sorter series were called tabulating equipment. The 1980 census specifically counted Tab operators ("Tabulating-machine operator").

=== Tape librarian ===
A tape librarian is responsible for the management, storage, and reporting involving data storage tapes. The tape librarian would develop and/or maintain an organization system for the storage and retrieval of tapes, and assist in disaster recovery. Additionally, the librarian would ensure the integrity of the tapes, and submit recommendations for replacement when needed. Some examples of equipment a tape librarian may work with are the IBM 3850.

== Gallery ==
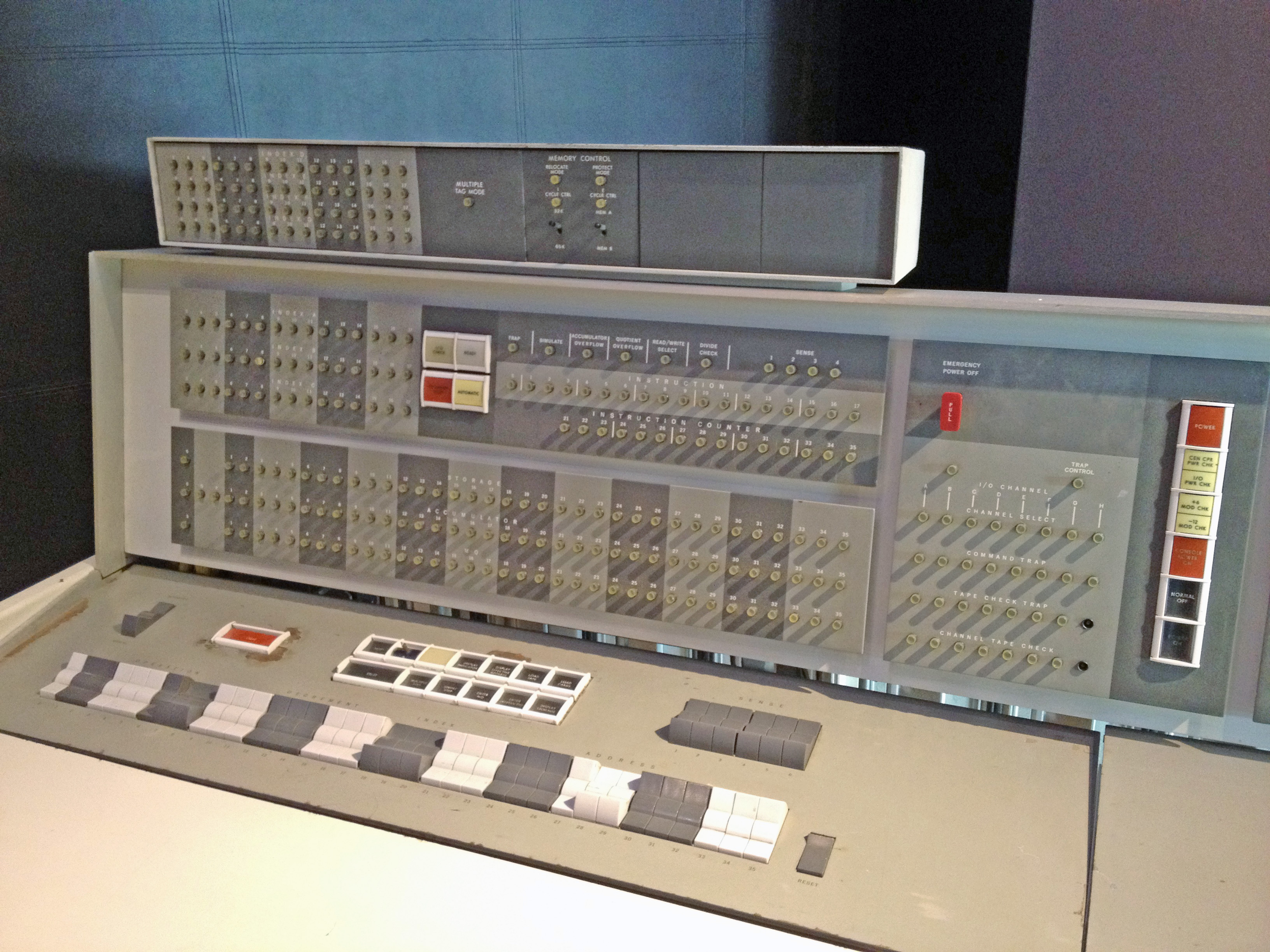
Modern System operator consoles no longer include large numbers of lights, switches, or buttons

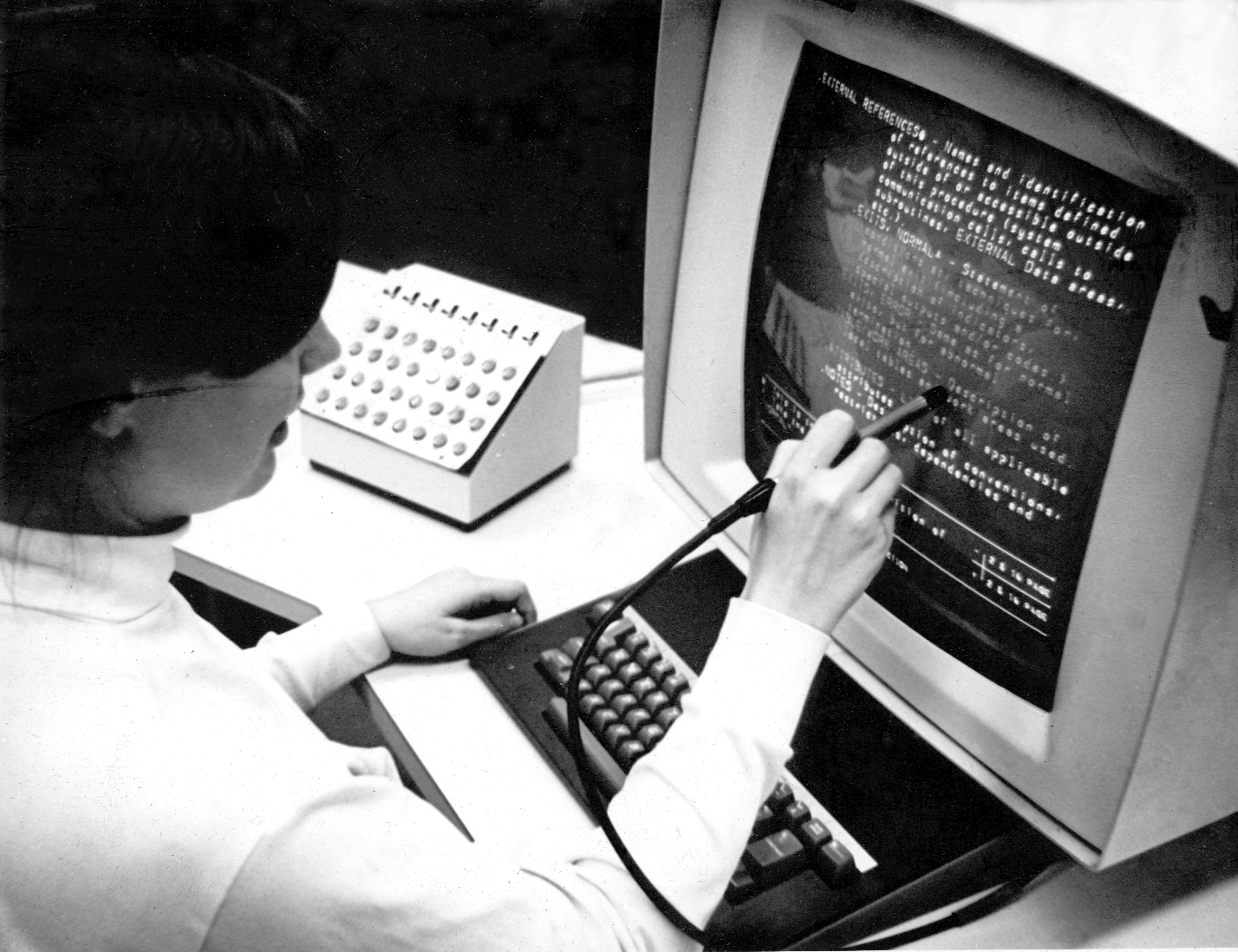
The 370/158 announcement said that "the console used a CRT display, a keyboard, and a light pen."

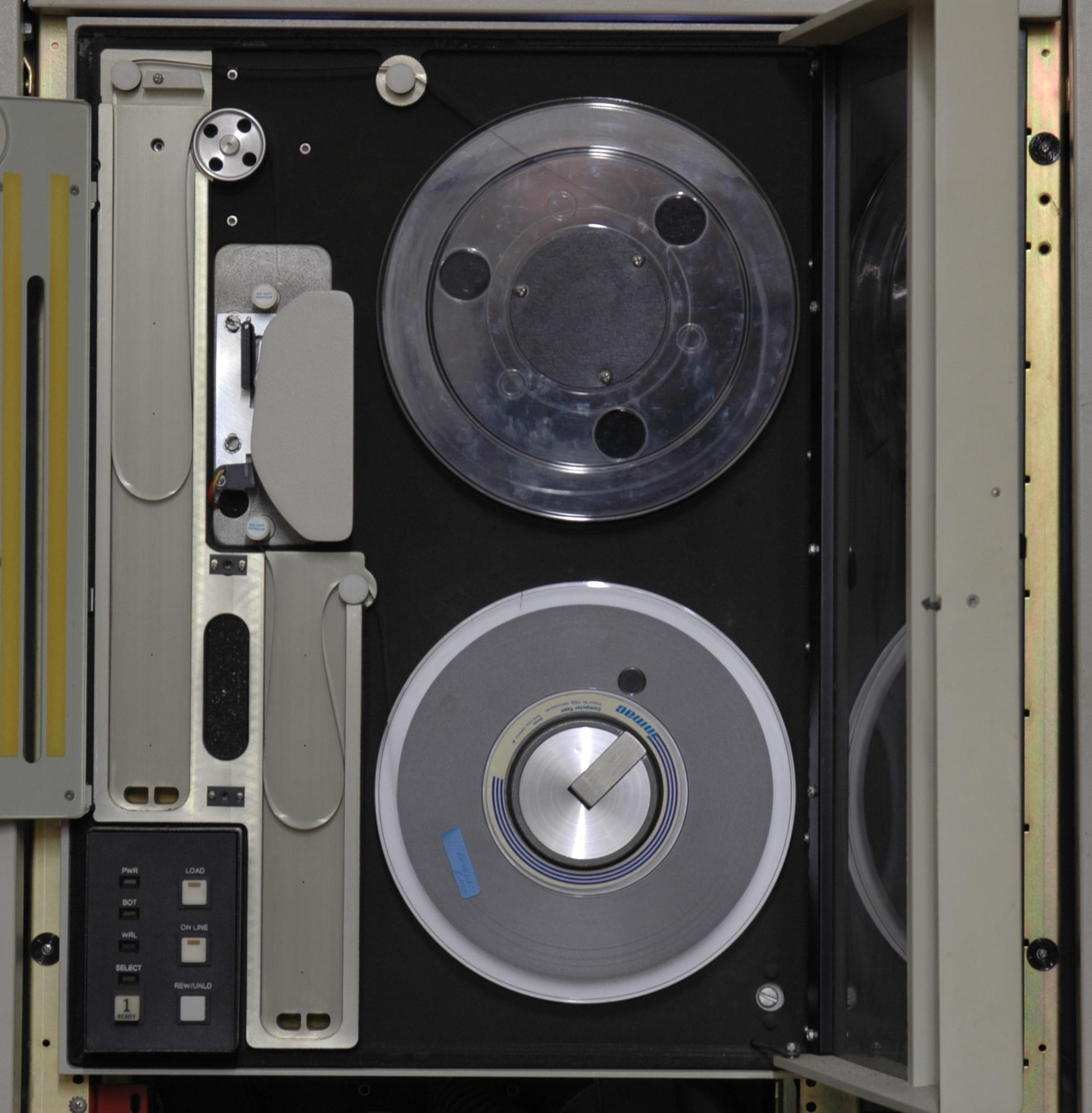
Open 9-track tape drive

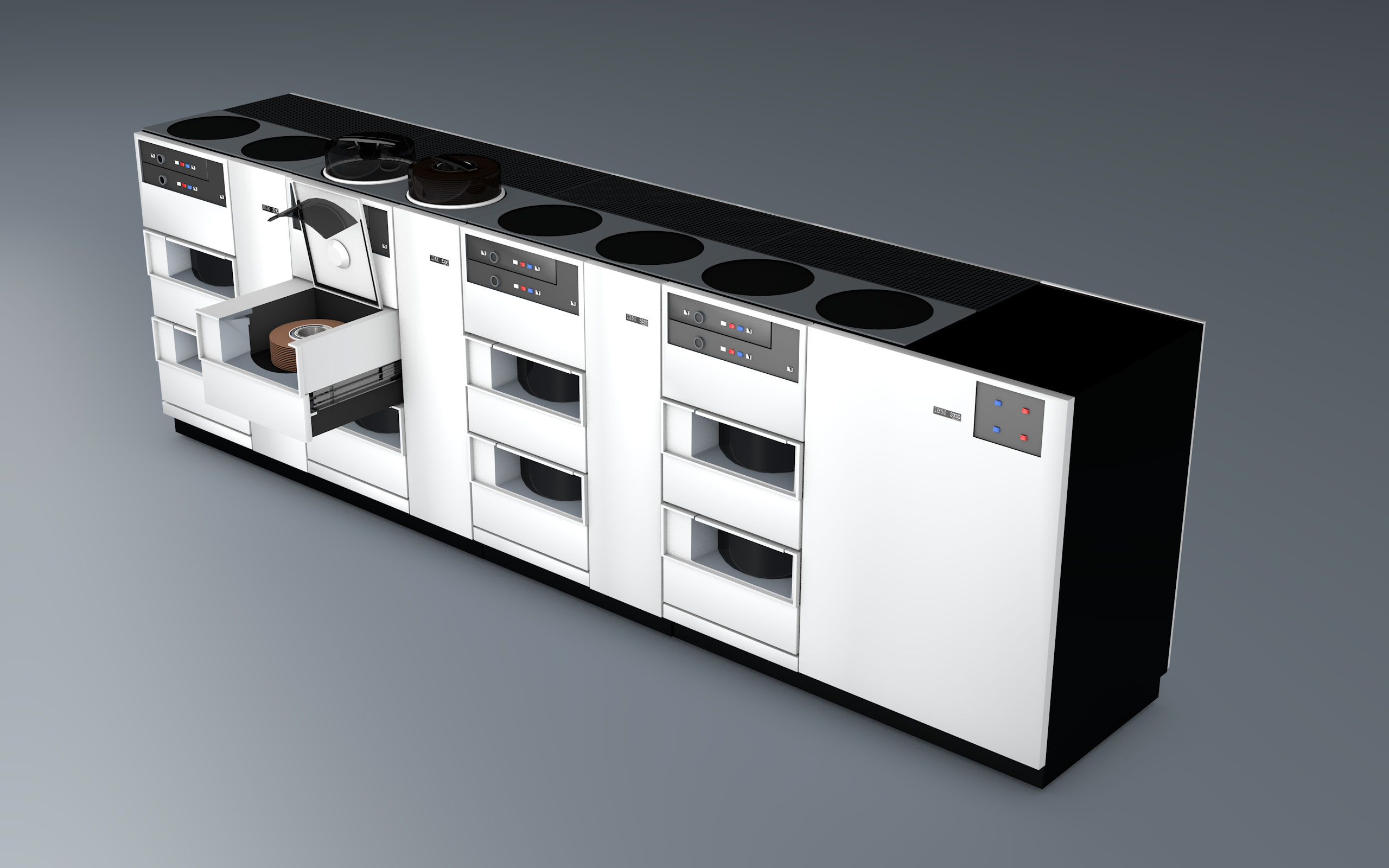
IBM 3330 Disk drive

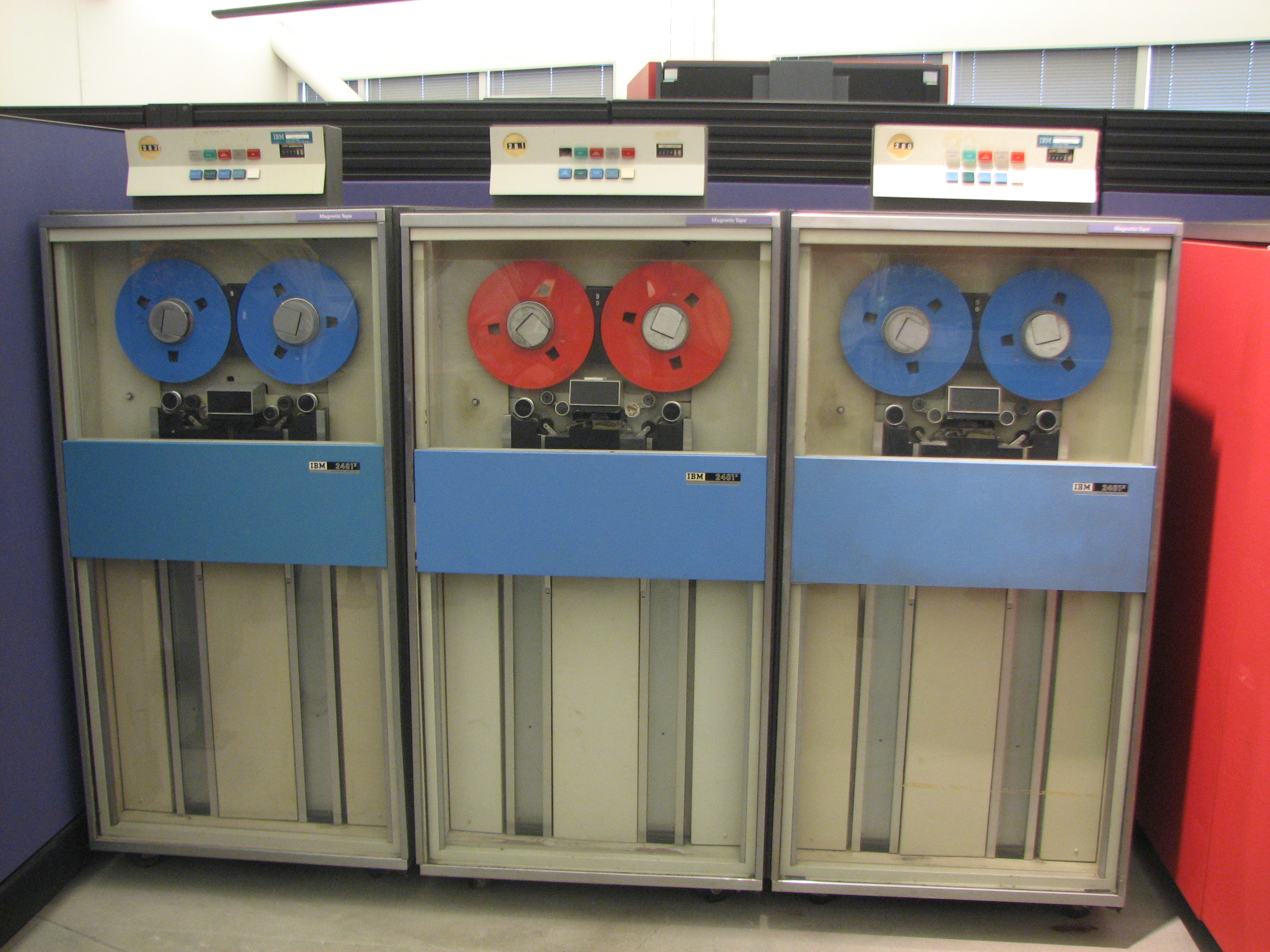
IBM System/360 tape drives

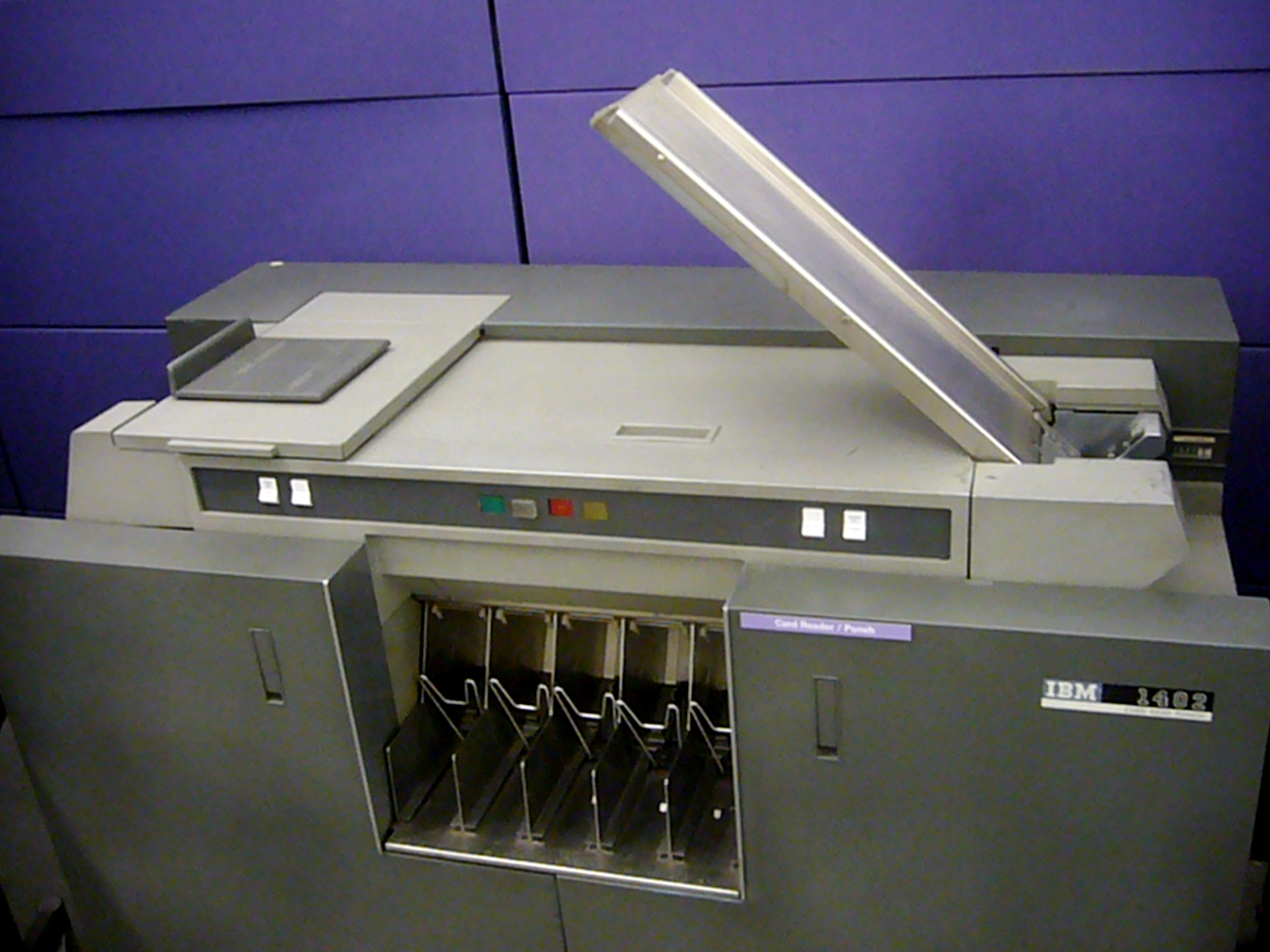
IBM 1402 high speed card reader and punch used in larger installations and typically run by an operator

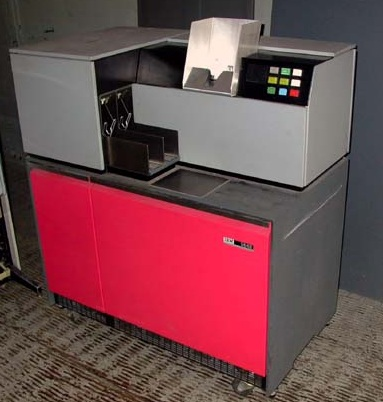
IBM 1442 medium speed card reader and punch used on many smaller computers such as the IBM 1130

== See also ==
- System administration
