= VAX Unit of Performance =

Type of computer benchmarking tool

The VAX Unit of Performance, or VUP for short, is an obsolete measurement of computer performance used by Digital Equipment Corporation (DEC). 1 VUP was equivalent to the performance of a VAX 11/780 completing a given task. One VUPS was roughly equivalent to 1 MIPS, and can be used interchangeably in most cases.

Other VAX machines and later workstation designs were compared in performance terms by defining system speed in VUPs, for instance, the VAXft Model 310 ran at 3.8 VUPs, meaning it ran roughly 3.8 times as fast as the 11/780.

The term was used largely within the DEC and its community, and fell from use as more standard ratings like SPEC became more widely used. This was especially true with the introduction of DEC workstations running Unix, in which case the VUP was of little use comparing the platforms to competition systems.
