= VAXft =

Family of fault-tolerant minicomputers

The VAXft was a family of fault-tolerant minicomputers developed and manufactured by Digital Equipment Corporation (DEC) using processors implementing the VAX instruction set architecture (ISA). "VAXft" stood for "Virtual Address Extension, fault tolerant". These systems ran the OpenVMS operating system, and were first supported by VMS 5.4. Two layered software products, VAXft System Services and VMS Volume Shadowing, were required to support the fault-tolerant features of the VAXft and for the redundancy of data stored on hard disk drives.

== Architecture ==
All VAXft systems shared the same basic system architecture. A VAXft system consisted of two "zones" that operated in lock-step: "Zone A" and "Zone B". Each zone was a fully functional computer, capable of running an operating system, and was identical to the other in hardware configuration. Lock-step was achieved by hardware on the CPU module. The CPU module of each zone was connected to the other with a crosslink cable. The crosslink cables carried the results of instructions executed by one CPU module to the other, where they were compared by hardware with the results of the same instructions executed by the latter to ensure that they were identical. The two zones were kept synchronous by a clock signal carried by the crosslink cables. When a hardware failure occurred in one of the zones, the affected zone was brought offline without bringing down the other zone, which continued to operate as normal. When repairs were completed, the offline zone was powered on and automatically resynchronized with the other zone, restoring redundancy.

== VAXft Model 310 ==
The VAXft Model 310, introduced as the VAXft 3000 Model 310, code named "Cirrus", was introduced in February 1990 and shipped in June. It was the first VAXft model, and was DEC's first fault-tolerant computer that was generally available. At the 1991 launch of new VAXft models, the VAX 3000 Model 310 was renamed to follow the new naming scheme, becoming the VAXft Model 310. The Model 310 had a theoretical maximum performance of 3.8 VUPs.

When announced, the Model 310 had a starting price of US$200,000. In August 1990, slow sales prompted DEC to reduce the US price of the Model 310 to US$168,000.

It used the KA520 CPU module containing a 16.67 MHz (60 ns cycle time) CVAX+ chip set with 32 KB of external secondary cache. The system contained two such CPU modules, one in each zone, running in lock-step.

=== VAXft Model 110 ===
The VAXft Model 110, code named "Cirrus", was an entry-level model announced on 18 March 1991 alongside three other models. The Model 110 was essentially a low-cost model of the VAXft Model 310, and had a theoretical maximum performance of 2.4 VUPs.

It contained two zones packed side by side in an enclosure. Compared to the Model 310, it was limited in expandability in regards to memory, storage capacity and available options. It was available in either a pedestal or rackmount configuration. The rackmount configuration was a pedestal without the plastic covers or casters that fitted in a standard 19-inch RETMA cabinet.

Each zone had a five-slot backplane for a KA510 CPU module, one to three 32 MB MS520 memory modules, one or two KFE52 system I/O controller modules and one or two DEC WANcontroller 620 (DSF32) wide area network (WAN) communications adapters. The leftmost slot was the first slot. The primary system controller resided in the first slot, the CPU module in the second, and the memory modules in the third, fourth and fifth slots. The second system I/O controller resided in either the fourth and fifth slots and the WAN communications adapters also in the fourth and fifth slots. The most basic system contained a CPU module, a memory module and a system I/O controller.

The DEC WANcontroller 620 was designed for use in VAXft systems. It provided two synchronous lines, each with a bandwidth of 64 KB. The lines could be operated as two independent lines or paired to provide redundancy.

=== VAXft Model 410 ===
The VAXft Model 410, code named "Cirrus II", was a mid-range model announced on 18 March 1991 alongside three other models. Originally supposed to ship in June or July 1991, it was delayed until September 1991, with the reason given by DEC being that it wanted to tune a new release of VMS for the system. The Model 410 was identical to the Model 310, but used the KA550 CPU module containing a 28.57 MHz (35 ns cycle time) SOC microprocessor with 128 KB of external secondary cache. It supported up to 256 MB of memory. The Model 410 had a theoretical maximum performance of 6.0 VUPs.

=== VAXft Model 610 ===
The VAXft Model 610, code named "Cirrus II", was a mid-range model announced on 18 March 1991 alongside three other models. Originally supposed to ship in June or July 1991, it was delayed until September 1991, with the reason given by DEC being that it wanted to tune a new release of VMS for the system.

The Model 610 was architecturally identical to the Model 410, except that the two zones were packaged vertically a 60" high cabinet, with Zone A above Zone B. The cabinet had more storage capacity than the systems packaged in pedestals, and for this reason the Model 610 was intended for data centers. It could have one or two expander cabinets placed on the left and right of the system for additional storage devices. These cabinets were front to rear cooled.

=== VAXft Model 612 ===
The VAXft Model 612 was a high-end model announced on 18 March 1991 alongside three other models. Originally supposed to ship in June or July 1991, it was delayed until September 1991, with the reason given by DEC being that it wanted to tune a new release of VMS for the system. The Model 612 was a VAXcluster of two VAXft Model 610s with an expansion cabinet positioned between the two systems as standard. It had a theoretical maximum performance of 12.0 VUPs. A second expansion cabinet could be added between the two system cabinets.

== VAXft Model 810 ==
The VAXft Model 810, code named "Jetstream", was a high-end model introduced in October 1993 instead of the targeted introduction date in the late summer or early fall of 1992. The system was developed by DEC, but was manufactured by an Italian industrial manufacturer, Alenia SpA. It had a theoretical maximum performance of 30.0 VUPs.

The Model 810 was a third generation VAXft system. It contained two zones vertically packaged in a cabinet. An optional expansion cabinet could be connected to the system, in addition to two uninterruptible power supplies, one for each zone.

It used the KA560-AA CPU module, which contained two 83.33 MHz (12 ns cycle time) NVAX+ microprocessors with 512 KB of B-cache (L2 cache). The module's two microprocessors operated a in lock-step fashion, and like previous VAXft systems, there were two such CPU modules in a system, one in each of the two zones, which operated in a lock-step fashion.

The Model 810 cabinet was 60.0 cm (24 in) wide, 170.0 cm (67 in) high and 86.0 cm (34 in) deep.
