= Synchronous Backplane Interconnect =

Internal processor-memory bus

The Synchronous Backplane Interconnect (SBI) was the internal processor-memory bus used by early VAX computers manufactured by the Digital Equipment Corporation of Maynard, Massachusetts.

The bus was implemented using Schottky TTL logic levels and allowed multiprocessor operation.
