= Michael Kolowich =

- Michael E. Kolowich
- Born: August 28, 1952 (age 74); Detroit, Michigan, U.S.
- Education: Harvard College (AB); Harvard Business School (MBA)
- Occupations: Technology and digital media entrepreneur
- Children: James, Stephen, Lindsay, Robert, Lucy McKee-Proctor (stepdaughter), Caroline Alexander (stepdaughter)
- Website: DigiNovations; OpenExchange Inc.

Michael Edmund Kolowich (born August 28, 1952) is an American new media and internet content entrepreneur and documentary filmmaker. He is chief product officer of College Guidance Network, Inc. and serves on the board of directors of OpenExchange Inc, where he was formerly chief content officer. He was founder and CEO of KnowledgeVision Systems Incorporated, which merged into OpenExchange in October, 2019. He was a partner at Bain & Company, chief marketing officer for Lotus Development Corporation, founding publisher and columnist for PC/Computing magazine, was founder and president of Ziff-Davis Interactive (now ZDNet), served as president of AT&T New Media, was chairman, president and CEO of Individual Incorporated, and co-founded NewsEdge Corporation.

== Background and education ==
Born in Detroit, Michigan, Kolowich is the eldest son of Raymund Frederick Kolowich and Marilynn Convery. After growing up in Michigan, he attended Portsmouth Abbey School in Portsmouth, Rhode Island and received his A.B. in 1974 from Harvard College, with a concentration in Engineering and Applied Physics/Computer Sciences. While at Harvard, Kolowich was news director of WHRB, Harvard Radio.

Kolowich later returned to Harvard to attend Harvard Business School, from which he received an M.B.A. with distinction in 1980.

== Career ==
After college in 1974, Kolowich joined the news staff at WBZ-TV in Boston as assignment editor. After a year at WPRI-TV in Providence, Rhode Island, Kolowich returned to WBZ-TV as producer of "Eyewitness News at Eleven." In 1976, Kolowich became an on-air reporter for "The Ten O'Clock News" at WGBH-TV in Boston, and was awarded an Emmy Award for a series on aviation safety.

After returning for two years of graduate school at Harvard, Kolowich joined the management consulting firm of Bain & Company, where he was best known for his work during the turnaround of Chrysler Corporation and his leadership on the employee buyout of Weirton Steel Corporation in 1983, leading to the bankruptcy of Weirton Steel within the next decade. He became a vice president and partner in Bain in 1984.

In 1985, Kolowich took a leave of absence from Bain to join the rapidly growing Lotus Development Corporation as corporate vice president, marketing and business development. After a company reorganization in 1987, he took line responsibility for all of Lotus' non-spreadsheet products, including Freelance Graphics, Agenda, Magellan, and Manuscript. He was responsible for negotiating and signing the development agreement with Iris Associates that gave Lotus the long-term rights to market the pioneering groupware product, Lotus Notes.

In 1988, William B. Ziff, Jr. personally recruited Kolowich to become founding publisher and columnist for a new computer magazine for Ziff-Davis Publishing Company. Launched as PC/Computing, the magazine reached a circulation of more than 1 million within five years.

In 1991, as he moved PC/Computing's headquarters from Boston to Foster City, California, Kolowich took over all of Ziff Davis' electronic publishing efforts, consolidating them under the name Ziff-Davis Interactive. The most notable product of these efforts was ZDNet, an online complement to Ziff-Davis' print publications, which later became the most valuable property in the Ziff-Davis portfolio. In 1994, when the Ziff family disposed of its publishing properties, Kolowich brought the company's online technology division, called the Interchange Online Network, to AT&T, where Kolowich was named president of AT&T New Media Services.

In 1996, Kolowich was named chairman, president and CEO of Individual Incorporated, an internet news filtering company that earlier that year been one of the first web content companies to go public successfully. In 1998, Kolowich negotiated a merger-of-equals with competitor Desktop Data, and co-founded NewsEdge Corporation, which was subsequently sold in 2001 to The Thomson Corporation.

In 2001, Kolowich founded DigiNovations as a multimedia production company that would apply video and multimedia technology to telling the stories of New England companies, organizations, and educational institutions. He has produced corporate and institutional documentary films for, among other clients, Harvard University, Massachusetts Institute of Technology, Museum of Science, Boston, Sacred Heart University, and Genzyme Corporation. He was architect and producer of Mitt TV, the internet TV channel of the Mitt Romney 2008 presidential campaign, and served on the board of Piper Aircraft and AmSafe Inc.

== Civic and professional affiliations ==
Michael Kolowich has served as a Museum Advisor for Museum of Science, Boston, where he was vice-chairman of the Program Advisory Committee, served on the President's Council of the Aircraft Owners and Pilots Association, and is past president and commissioner of Concord-Carlisle Youth Baseball & Softball. He was also an officer of the National Professional Videographers Association and is a trustee emeritus of the Massachusetts Technology Leadership Council.

== Sources ==
- Michael Kolowich on LinkedIn
- College Guidance Network Team
- Director Profile: Michael Kolowich on OpenExchange site
- Executive Profile: Michael Kolowich on KnowledgeVision site
- Open Exchange and KnowledgeVision Merge
- KnowledgeVision Goes to Market with New Company, Experienced Team
- "Project Athena" and the Moment of Conception, ZDNet, April 17, 2011
- New Executives Added at Piper
- Profile in EventDV Magazine
- "Individual Inc. Names Michael Kolowich as CEO". Newsbytes Network. September 3, 1996.
- SEC Public Company Filings: Michael E. Kolowich
- Press Release: Individual/Desktop Data Merger
- WGBH Timeline (1946-1978)
- Lotus Software
