= Concentric (disambiguation) =

Concentric objects share the same center or axis.

Concentric may also refer to:

- Concentric muscle contractions
- Concentric (album), a 2010 album by Jennifer Gentle
- Concentric Circles (Chris Potter album)
- Concentric Circles (Kenny Barron album)
- Concentric Data Systems, an American software company
