= Lotus Magellan =

- Lotus Magellan 2.0
- Original authors: Bill Gross; Larry Gross
- Developer: Lotus Development Corporation
- Release: April 1989; 37 years ago
- Final release: 2.0 / March 1990; 36 years ago
- Operating system: MS-DOS
- Type: desktop search

Lotus Magellan is an MS-DOS desktop search package, conceived and developed by Bill Gross and released in 1989 by Lotus Development Corporation, most famous for Lotus 1-2-3.

== Operation ==
Running under MS-DOS, Magellan scans the directories and files on a drive or floppy diskettes and creates a master index. It is aware of various current formats and provides the ability to view files without launching the original applications that created them. Its most powerful feature is fuzzy searching, connecting files by relative frequency of keywords, allowing the user to organize related data no matter where or in what format it existed on the user's computer.

Given this "semantic view" of the user's file system, Magellan not only exposes "hidden meaning" from disparate data, but also facilitates the actual movement of files and directories into a better physical organization. Advertisements promised to "Get all your ducks in a row" and showed a picture of a line of obedient rubber ducks.

== Fate ==
Lotus discontinued Magellan in the early 1990s, after selling about 500,000 copies at about $50 each. Magellan was one of several significant developments from Lotus Software (i.e. "1-2-3", "Notes" and office software for the Apple Macintosh) that, despite significant usefulness and market share, failed to keep the company afloat. Lotus was acquired by IBM in 1995. The old MS-DOS Lotus software Magellan, Lotus Agenda, HAL, and Lotus Manuscript have since been released as freeware.

== Reception ==
James Fallows bemoaned Magellan's discontinuation, writing in 1997 that he still used it despite the difficulty of running the DOS application on Microsoft Windows.
