= Lotus approach =

The Lotus approach may refer to:

- The Lotus principle, a foundation of international law
- IBM Lotus Approach database software
