= Mudcat Café =

Folk song discussion forum and website

The Mudcat Café is an online discussion group and song and tune database, which also includes many other features relating to folk music.

== History ==
The website was originally founded in October 1996 as a Blues-oriented discussion site. It was named after a Mississippi Delta region catfish, capable of living in muddy waters, known locally as a mudcat. This region was the birthplace of the American Delta Blues style. Mudcat Café later transitioned from a blues music forum to a folk music forum. The website incorporated the Digital Tradition song database after the database lost its original home. Max D. Spiegel, the website's founder, is still its administrator as of 2023.

== Content ==
Membership is free and the site is run by volunteers.

=== Forum ===
The discussion group (the Forum) is divided into music-related and non-music-related topics:

- The music-related section hosts lively discussions on American folk music, British folk music and that of many other cultures, origins and lyrics of songs, folklore and related information. Information is provided and maintained on a large number of folk clubs, folk festivals, music sessions and dances around the world. Requests for origins, lyrics and chords of songs are answered here. Many performing artists also contribute to the discussions from time to time.
- The non-music section contains discussion on everything unrelated to music.

=== Digital Tradition song database ===
Mudcat hosts both a web-based and a downloadable version of the Digital Tradition song database (also known as DigiTrad or DT). It was started in 1988 by pooling the song collections of Dennis Cook and Susan Friedman in electronic form, using askSam format. The song database is updated on a regular basis by members ("Mudcatters") and now contains the words to over 9,000 folk songs, many with an accompanying MIDI file and links to further information.

The downloadable version was last updated in 2002 and is available in MS-DOS askSam format. Versions were previously available for Mac and Windows.

=== Resources ===
The Links section of the site provides links to "Festivals and Venues", "Instruments", "Lyrics, Sheet Music & Tabs", "Performers and Composers", among other subjects dealing with folk music and blues.

The Mudcat Songbook on the site presents MP3 recordings of songs written and recorded by Mudcatters.

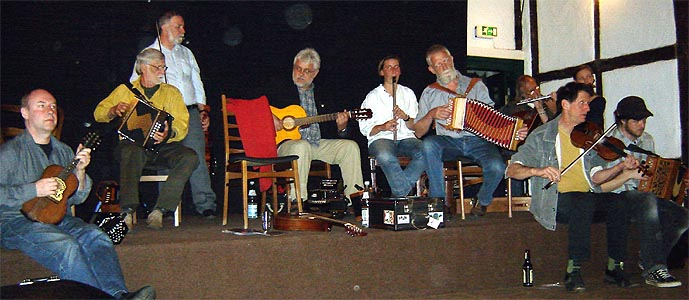
Mudcatters and friends playing at a céilidh in Kiel, Germany, as part of the Mudcat Eurogathering 2007

== Events ==
=== Mudgatherings ===
Mudcatters in different countries meet up regularly at "mudgatherings".

=== Mudcat Worldwide Singaround ===
Mudcat began a regular online event known as the Mudcat Worldwide Singaround in June 2020.
