= Freada Kapor Klein =

Venture capitalist, social policy researcher and philanthropist (born 1952)

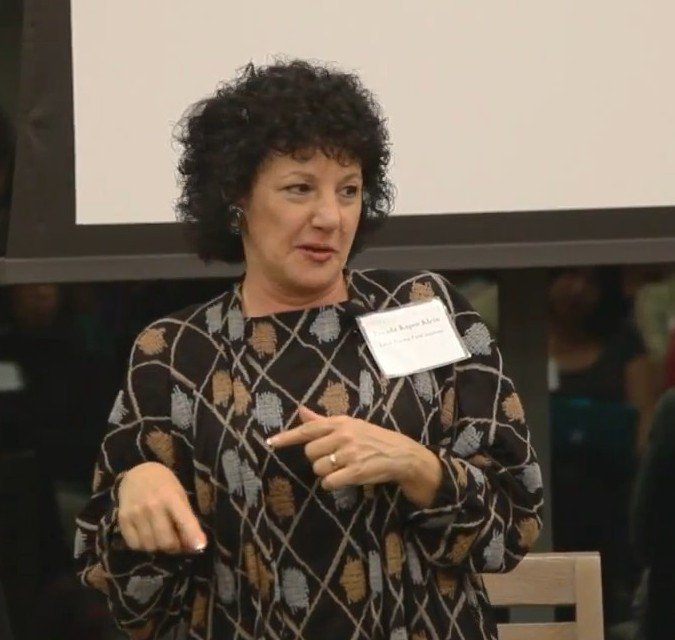
- Klein in 2011
- Born: Freada Klein; August 26, 1952 (age 74); Kansas City, Missouri, US
- Education: University of California, Berkeley; Brandeis University (PhD)
- Known for: Organizational development and human resources
- Spouse: Mitch Kapor
- Children: 2 stepchildren

Freada Kapor Klein (born August 26, 1952) is an American venture capitalist, social policy researcher and philanthropist. As a partner at Kapor Capital and the Kapor Center for Social Impact, she is known for efforts to diversify the technology workforce through activism and investments. Her 2007 book Giving Notice: Why the Best and the Brightest Leave the Workplace and How You Can Help Them Stay examines the reasons people have for leaving corporate America as well as the human and financial cost.

Klein first became a victims' advocate in the 1970s. During this time, she noticed a widespread denial of the prevalence of sexual harassment and compared it to the silence surrounding rape that she had seen six years earlier. Kapor Klein's association with technology companies began when she started working for Lotus Development Corporation in 1984. In 2015, Benjamin Jealous called her "the moral center of Silicon Valley and an O.G. in technology".

== Early life and education ==
Klein was born in Kansas City, Missouri in 1952 and grew up in the San Fernando Valley with two older siblings. Her father was a chemical engineer attending medical school. Her mother was one of the few survivors of a Jewish family who fled Russia to escape pogroms. When applying to universities, Klein looked for places where there were high levels of student activism. Studying at the University of California, Berkeley, she volunteered at a rape crisis center and later interviewed rapists who were in prison. She graduated from Berkeley with a bachelor's degree in criminology in 1974 and founded the Alliance Against Sexual Coercion in 1976. This is considered to be the first organization in the United States to focus on preventing sexual harassment in the workplace. In 1984, Klein received a Ph.D. in social policy and research from the Heller School for Social Policy and Management of Brandeis University in Waltham, Massachusetts with a Social Science Research Council fellowship for the study of sexual harassment in federal government employment.

== Career ==
After receiving her first degree, Klein was a writer for the newsletter for the women's organization Feminist Alliance Against Rape. Kapor Klein joined Lotus Development Corporation in 1984, when Lotus 1-2-3 was widely recognized as the killer app which made computers ubiquitous in business. Her position was Head of Employee Relations, Organizational Development and Management Training. A stated vision for the company was to be "the most progressive employer in the United States". In 1987, Kapor Klein founded the consulting firm Klein Associates to provide training on issues of fairness and bias reduction in work environments.

Kapor Klein became a partner at Kapor Capital, which was founded in 1999. The fund, which has made a pledge to only invest in companies that prioritize diversity, focuses on products that "close gaps of access and opportunity". An example she gave was the mobile app Pigeonly which aims to bypass the high cost of phone calls in and out of the prison system. Her investment sectors include education, health, and consumer finance. Kapor Capital has been absorbed into the broader organization known as the Kapor Center for Social Impact. Another project under this umbrella is the Level Playing Field Institute, founded by Kapor Klein in 2001. Aiming to foster interest in STEM fields among underrepresented groups, the LPFI promotes computer science participation through hackathons and workshops. Some studies produced by the institute include The Tilted Playing Field and The Corporate Leaders Survey. The institute is also known for its Summer Math and Science Honors Academy (SMASH) three-summer high school program. SMASH has been described as "100 percent students of color" and has led most of them to pursue a degree in a quantitative science.

Kapor Klein's for-profit and non-profit organizations, which are run from the same office, regularly contribute studies on racial and gender disparity. They have explored factors ranging from direct discrimination to attrition in the STEM pipeline. Two notable studies are an assessment of inclusion efforts at Fortune 500 manufacturing firms and a survey of bias experienced by Massachusetts physicians and medical students. Described as "in regular touch with the White House", Kapor Klein has advised the World Bank and the United Nations. She also gave input on the Civil Rights Act of 1991.

In 2016, Kapor Klein, along with Erica Baker, bethanye Blount, Tracy Chou, Laura Gomez, Y-Vonne Hutchinson, Ellen Pao, and Susan Wu founded the non-profit organization Project Include to develop customized human resources advice in consultation with startup executives. Several companies employing 25–1,000 people signed on for the program following its launch in May. Although they were initially kept anonymous, the names of the clients were announced a month later.

Freada Kapor Klein is an advisor to Crossculture VC and sits on the board of the Berkeley Foundation. While serving on Berkeley's College of Letters and Science board in 2000, Kapor Klein founded the IDEAL Scholars Fund with three other board members and alumni. Designed as a response to California Proposition 209, the scholarship invests in high-caliber, underrepresented students and provides access to staff in mentor roles.

In the midst of Uber's 2017 sexual harassment scandal, Kapor-Klein wrote in an open letter that as an investor in the company, she was disappointed with its under-commitment to inclusion. She criticized technology companies for making reporting difficult and said it was unfortunate that "Medium and Twitter have become tech's complaints channels."

== Personal life ==
Freada Klein met Mitch Kapor during her time at Lotus Development. In the 1990s, they began a relationship and eventually married. Although never calling for an outright ban, Kapor Klein is largely opposed to office romances and believes that harassment can often result when they are executed poorly. On their decision to wait, she stated "he was smart enough as the CEO to not hit on the person who co-founded the first group on sexual harassment in the U.S. He's very bright."

Kapor and Kapor Klein moved to the San Francisco Bay Area in 1999 and lived in Oakland, California, with her stepson Adam and stepdaughter Molly. The couple attempted to build a large home in Berkeley, California, described as "akin to an office building" by environmental groups. They managed to obtain approval but nevertheless put the lot up for sale in 2016.

Kapor Klein was on the Board of Trustees of the Summer Science Program from 2004 to 2006. Her husband, also a board member, had been a student of the program in 1966. She has challenged millennials working on diversity to inform themselves about the movement's history and learn "how recent and how complicated the whole issue of stereotyping and limiting opportunity" is.

== Bibliography ==
- Rags Brophy, Mary Bularzik, Martha Hooven, Freada Klein, Liz Cohn-Stuntz, Lynn Wehrli. Myths and Facts About Sexual Harassment. Alliance Against Sexual Coercion, 1977.
- Tia Cross, Freada Klein, Barbara Smith, Beverly Smith. Face-to-face, day-to-day racism. Sojourner, 1979.
- Freada Kapor-Klein. Giving notice: Why the best and brightest are leaving the workplace and how you can help them stay. Jossey-Bass, 2007.
- Freada Kapor-Klein, Ana Diaz-Hernandez. Pattern recognition: How hidden bias operates in tech startup culture. XRDS: Crossroads — The ACM Magazine for Students, 2014.
