= IBM Lotus Forms =

IBM Forms is a suite of products by IBM's Lotus Software division that interact to develop and deliver data-driven, XML-based electronic forms (e-forms) to end-users. IBM Forms consists of a server, designer, and client viewer that enable creation, deployment, and streamlining of forms-based processes. IBM Forms originally used Extensible Forms Description Language (XFDL) as the format for its electronic forms, and it has gradually added XForms to XFDL as that standard has matured.

With IBM Forms, organizations can use electronic forms to gather information from users and transmit that information to other systems. IBM Forms can be used as the front-end for business processes such as opening a new account. When a customer enters their information into a form and submits it for processing, their information could pass into a workflow application (such as FileNet or WebSphere Business Integration), a database (such as DB2 Universal Database or DB2 Content Manager), or any other type of application or process.

There are four IBM Forms products:

- IBM Forms Server serves e-forms to web browsers and provides an API and platform to integrate e-forms with other business processes.
- IBM Forms Designer provides a WYSIWYG environment within Eclipse for designing e-forms.
- IBM Forms Viewer is a rich client that allows users to interact with e-forms online and offline.
- IBM Forms Turbo allows users to create, deploy, fill and perform basic reports on eForms using a Web browser.

== History of IBM Forms ==
IBM Forms was originally a product called PureEdge Forms, developed by PureEdge Solutions based in Victoria, British Columbia, Canada. IBM bought PureEdge in 2005 and renamed the technology IBM Workplace Forms. In 2007, it was renamed Lotus Forms, starting with version 3.0. In 2010, it was rebranded IBM Forms, starting with version 4.0.

== Previous incarnation of Lotus Forms ==
In 1994, Lotus Development Corporation introduced Lotus Forms, another tool for creating electronic and printed forms. It has no relation to the current IBM Forms product.

== Industry Standards ==
From 1993 to 1998, PureEdge (since acquired by IBM) developed the Universal Forms Description Language (UFDL). XFDL is the result of developing an XML syntax for the UFDL, thereby permitting the expression of forms in a syntax that promotes application interoperability and adherence to worldwide Internet standards. The original version of XFDL was published as a W3C Note in 1998. A number of features of XFDL have since been incorporated into a W3C Recommendation called XForms between 2003 and 2009.
