= Lotus Jazz =

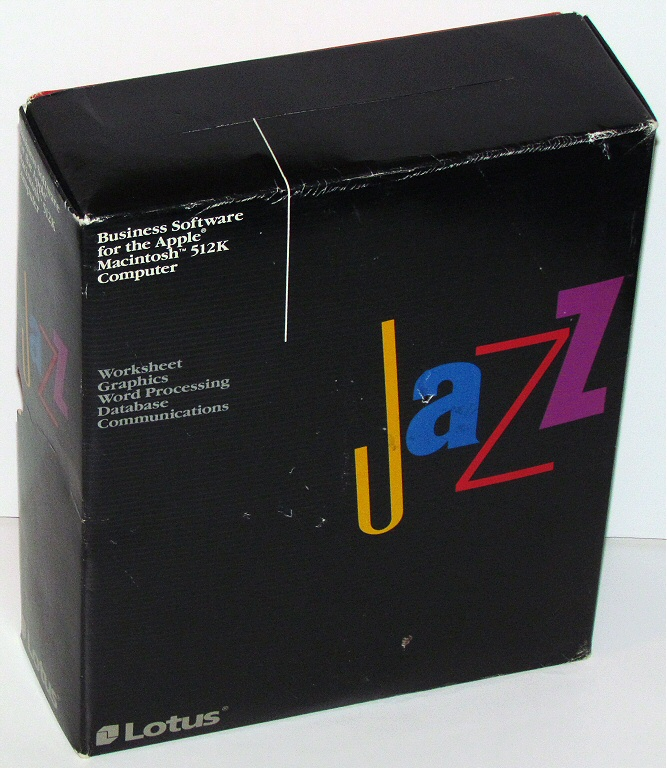
Release 1 package

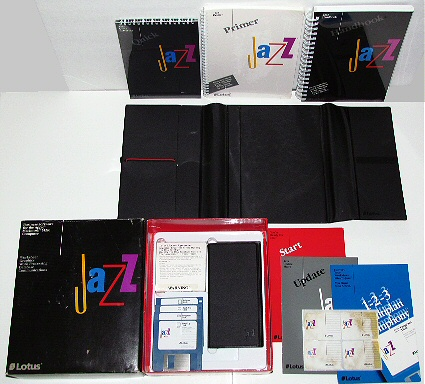
Inside the box

Lotus Jazz is an integrated suite of word processor, spreadsheet, database, graphics, and communication software designed for the Macintosh 512K. It was released in 1985 and retailed for US$595 (equivalent to $1,781 in 2025). The name was intended to evoke a group of musicians who together create something larger than each of the individual players.

The Lotus 1-2-3 spreadsheet was the killer application for the business-oriented IBM PC, and Jazz was an attempt to recreate that success for Macintosh. With the tagline "The software Macintosh was invented for," and promoted on TV at great expense, it was poorly received by reviewers and consumers and became a high-profile flop. In 1988, Lotus was on the verge of releasing an improved version as Modern Jazz, but the project was cancelled.

== Overview ==
Jazz shipped on four 400K 3½" diskettes: one for start-up, one containing the main program, a copy protected backup program disk, and a disk of sample files. This requires multiple swaps of the start-up and program or backup disks. Lotus Jazz Release 1 cannot be run from a hard drive or dual 400K floppy disk drives. If the start-up or both of the main program disks fail, the software is unusable.

The terminal emulation module is integrated with the spreadsheet module, allowing users dialing into corporate mainframes to have onscreen reports be parsed directly into spreadsheet columns for later editing and refinement.

== Reception ==
Lotus sold 20,000 copies of the original version of Jazz, while Microsoft sold 200,000 of Excel. By 1987 Computerworld described it as a failure.

In an extensive Macworld review in 1985, Gordon McComb wrote, "It is well thought out, but has both strong and weak points." He pointed out missing features, such as macros, split windows, and linking spreadsheets together. He cited working within the tight memory limitations as a significant drawback:

In fact, the way Jazz uses memory makes it seems like it was designed for a Macintosh with more than 512K of memory. Perhaps with the advent of 1- or 2- megabyte Macs, Jazz can dress in a suit it doesn't outgrow so quickly.

Creative Computing's John J. Anderson wrote, "There is nothing wrong with Jazz that a few healthy software revisions can't patch. Then again, not much of it is really right, either—right in the way it really should have been if it could have been." He called out the $600 price tag and the 512K RAM limit of the Mac as major issues.

=== Retrospective ===
In 2014, Lotus co-founder Mitch Kapor said, "We were doing business products, and a spreadsheet was an enterprise product. The Mac in 1985 and the enterprise was a complete nonstarter." He summarized some of the development and promotion mistakes:

It was just asking too much of the Mac. It was overly ambitious, and it had bugs in it. We spent a fortune on advertising, including TV advertising, which was one of the worst business decisions I ever made. It was just like setting fire to bales of hundred-dollar bills.

John C. Dvorak blamed the failure of Jazz on the high price, copy protection, not calling the product 1-2-3, weak import/export functions, and a misguided ad campaign.
