= AskSam =

AskSam, (stylized as askSam, which stood for "Access Stored Knowledge via Symbolic Access Method") from AskSam Systems, was a "free form" database desktop application that competed with a number of other personal information manager (PIM) applications. It was used for organizing disparate information such as email messages, documents, text files, spreadsheets, addresses, web pages into dynamic folders, and allowing these to be easily searched, and the results exported to spreadsheets or as a report.

The last version was AskSam 7, released in July 2008.

== History ==
The Florida company AskSam Systems was formed in 1985 and located in Perry, Florida. The earliest versions of AskSam were for MS-DOS, but later versions were for Windows. There were also Professional versions with a more powerful search, and networked versions. A web-publishing option was also available with "askSam Electronic Publisher".

When 4.0 was released in 2001, so was web publisher package AskSam Web Publisher 4.0, described as "letting you make the database searchable in any browser."

By 2004, the competitive landscape included "names like ADM, ... BrainStorm, Chandler, Enfish, InfoSelect, iRider, Lookout, Onfolio, TheBrain and Zoot.". Asksam was ahead of its time in many ways, and today applications like Roam Research, Craft.do, Logseq, and Obsidian are beginning to fill the ability Asksam had for hyperlinked rapid note retrieval, though still unmatched for reporting.

In 2014 personal information manager MyInfo added support for importing text-delimited AskSam files.

== See also ==
- Chandler
- Lotus Agenda
- Lotus Organizer
- MyInfo
