= IBM Service Management Framework =

The Service Management Framework (SMF) is a software product by IBM which implements the OSGi Service Platform.

It is available as a component of other IBM products, including IBM Lotus Expeditor, a platform enabling OSGi developers to build configurable, disconnectable, managed, applications and services for desktop, mobile, and embeddable clients delivering web, Ajax, and/or rich user interfaces.

According to the internet archive support for this was dropped in October 2007, this is unexplained and may be because of the new release of the OSGi standard r4. (This is most likely because it was turned over to Eclipse to be the Equinox launcher)
