= Concentric Data Systems =

- Type: Subsidiary
- Industry: Software
- Founded: 1979; 47 years ago
- Founders: John J. Henderson, Jonathan Sachs
- Parent: Wall Data Corporation; Liveware Publishing (R&R only)

Concentric Data Systems, Inc. was founded in December 1979 by John J. Henderson and Jonathan Sachs, both having left their jobs as system programmers at Data General Corporation. Originally, the company undertook a variety of software consulting projects for the Data General line of computers. In 1981, the company developed a spreadsheet product, CompuCalc, that ran on Data General hardware and was modeled after VisiCalc.

In 1982, Sachs left and joined Mitch Kapor to found Lotus Development Corporation.

Concentric transitioned to a product development company, producing a series of software products for the IBM PC. The products were a file manager, C.I.P, followed by a report writer for Lotus, 1-2-3 Report Writer, followed by a series of report writers marketed under the name R&R. The R&R products worked with dBase, FoxBase, FoxPro, and various SQL database products.

In 1995, Concentric Data Systems was acquired by Wall Data Corporation of Kirkland, WA.

In 1999, Liveware Publishing, Inc. acquired the copyrights and intellectual property of the entire R&R and Arpeggio product line from Wall Data Corporation. R&R has been continuously updated and sold through the present.
