= IBM Lotus Web Content Management =

IBM Web Content Manager
- Developer: IBM
- Initial release: 2003
- Stable release: 9.0 / December 13, 2016; 9 years ago
- Written in: Java
- Operating system: IBM AIX, IBM i, Linux, Solaris, Microsoft Windows, z/OS
- Type: Enterprise web content management software
- License: Proprietary
- Website: ibm.com/lotus/webcontentmanagement

IBM Web Content Manager (or WCM) is a proprietary web content management application by the Lotus Software division of IBM.

== Overview ==
IBM Web Content Manager allows content owners within an organization to:

- Author and maintain the organization's web pages using a rich text editor
- Store web pages to a central repository with access controls
- Use templates to create new pages
- Use workflows to standardize web page creation and maintenance

The software is available in two editions: IBM Web Content Manager and IBM Web Content Manager — Standard Edition.

WCM includes WebSphere Portal components for use as an authoring, staging, or development environment for creating and maintaining content within WCM. Since 2009, it has also included the Ephox EditLive! rich text editor. WCM adheres to the Java Portlet Specification version 2 standard.

== History ==
IBM Web Content Manager was originally known as Aptrix, created by an independent software company called Presence Online. After IBM bought the company in 2003, Aptrix was renamed IBM Workplace Web Content Management. It was renamed IBM Lotus Web Content Management in 2008 with the version 6.1 release of the product. In 2011, the product was renamed again to IBM Web Content Manager.
