= I Am You Are =

Studio album by Jennifer Gentle
- Released: 2001
- Genre: Psychedelic rock Acid rock
- Label: SillyBoy Entertainment

Jennifer Gentle chronology
I Am You Are (2001)	Funny Creatures Lane (2002)

I Am You Are is the début album by the Italian psychedelic rock band Jennifer Gentle, released in 2001.

== Track list ==
1. Sound Check
2. Sweet Girl, I Love You!
3. Rubber and South
4. Rudy's Key Balls
5. No Mind in My Mind
6. Bring Them
7. Always Been Together
8. The Strumpfhose Melodie
9. Caterpillar Song
10. Husbands
11. The Pilots
12. Single I've Seen the Seas
