= The Wrong Cage =

EP by Jennifer Gentle, Kawabata Makoto
- Released: 2002
- Genre: Psychedelic rock Acid rock Noise rock
- Label: Silly Boy Entertainment

Jennifer Gentle, Kawabata Makoto chronology
Funny Creatures Lane (2002)	The Wrong Cage (2002)	Valende (2004)

The Wrong Cage is an EP by the Italian psychedelic rock band Jennifer Gentle, in collaboration with the guitarist of Acid Mothers Temple, Kawabata Makoto, released in 2002.

The EP was recorded live, during an Italian mini-tour, on May 23 and May 24, 2002 at Banale, Padua and The Art & Co., Gorizia, respectively.

== Track listing ==
1. "Bring Them"
2. "Man from Mu" (Makoto Sarongi solo)
3. "Couple in Bed by a Green Flashing Light"
