= Jim Manzi =

Jim Manzi (born December 22, 1951) is an American investment executive, the former chairman, president and CEO of Lotus Development Corporation, and currently a private investor in various technology start-up ventures.

== Early career ==
Born in New York City, Manzi received his B.A. in Classics from Colgate University in 1973, and later received his M.A. in International Relations from the Fletcher School of Law and Diplomacy at Tufts University in Medford, Massachusetts. In 1973, Manzi was a research assistant to William F. Buckley, and journeyed to the Soviet Union with the editorial staff of National Review. Later, Manzi worked as a management consultant at McKinsey & Company.

== Lotus ==
In 1982, Manzi joined Lotus Development. He became president in 1984 and two years later chairman and CEO ,succeeding founder Mitchell Kapor. When Kapor left the company, Manzi steered the company away from desktop application software. He is credited with successfully migrating the company to and creating a new category of network applications. The product, Lotus Notes, was developed by Ray Ozzie and a team of engineers at Iris Associates, in conjunction with a core team at Lotus. Ultimately the company was sold for $3.5 billion to IBM, largely on the strength of the potential of Lotus Notes. On October 11, 1995 Manzi announced his resignation from the Lotus division of IBM.

== Career after Lotus ==
Since 1995, via his investment company Stonegate Capital, Manzi has been involved in the creation and development of a number of technology start-up ventures.

He is on the boards of Elysium Health and Paxos.. For 15 years until 2023, he was chairman of Thermo Fisher Scientific a public company in life sciences technology and services with $40 billion in sales and a market cap of more than $200 billion.

== Personal life ==
Manzi is married to Kay Calvert, a retired technology executive. From a prior marriage, Manzi has three children, Julianna, 40, Jay 38 and Jack, 33.
