= Lotus Freelance Graphics =

Presentation computer program

IBM Lotus Freelance Graphics
- Developer: Lotus Development
- Stable release: 9.8 + Fixpack 6 / 2002
- Operating system: Microsoft Windows
- Type: Presentation program
- License: Proprietary
- Website: Freelance Graphics

Lotus Freelance Graphics is an information graphics and presentation program developed by Lotus Development Corporation following its acquisition of Graphic Communications Inc. in 1986. It was first released for DOS and OS/2 operating systems, then later released as part of the Lotus SmartSuite for Microsoft Windows. (In a reference to its original developer, Graphic Communications Inc., Freelance's executable file was named GCIFL.)

Pre-Windows versions of Lotus Freelance Graphics included mouse support (provided a mouse driver for the OS had also been installed). However, many users considered the 'points and vector' graphics application easier and faster from the keyboard, as it utilized many keyboard shortcuts.

The Windows-compatible version allowed users to create and compile text, digital images, diagrams, basic drawings and charts (such as bar charts and pie charts) into a digital slide show. It was originally a drawing tool, but was enhanced to include charting by either manually inputting data or importing data from the Lotus 1-2-3 spreadsheet program.

Freelance worked within DOS to produce slides comparable to those of Microsoft PowerPoint, a program originally created for the Macintosh. Because Lotus opted to develop Freelance for OS/2, Microsoft got a head start developing and promoting the Windows version of its application. When IBM then acquired Lotus, Microsoft used a licensing issue to delay IBM's access to the Windows 95 code base, allowing Microsoft Office to be released six months ahead of Lotus SmartSuite. As a result, when OS/2 failed to gain widespread adoption, Freelance became a little-used application.

Freelance was eventually grafted into a new version of 1-2-3 for Windows (Smart Suite), but by then PowerPoint and Excel had become dominant. Freelance's files were much smaller (typically 50 KB for a full presentation) compared to the competition's, allowing 20 or more presentations to be stored on a single floppy disc. However, the quality of the Freelance product eventually deteriorated as IBM's support of SmartSuite dwindled.
