= Feminist Alliance Against Rape =

1970s feminist organization to address the causes of rape

The Feminist Alliance Against Rape (FAAR) was formed as a sub-group of the DC Rape Crisis Center in 1974 as a way to network among feminists in the anti-rape movement. FAAR published a monthly newsletter that invited others to join the discussion on violence against women and provided resources and practical information for grassroots organizers.

From the introductory article of the newsletter:

"By establishing F.A.A.R. we are providing a structure which can be used to strengthen the channels of communication and mutual support among community-based feminist anti-rape projects."

— "Introductory article (untitled)", Feminist Alliance Against Rape Newsletter (July–August 1974)

Writers for the FAAR newsletter included Larry Cannon and William Fuller, who wrote about prison rape, Deb Friedman, Freada Klein, Linda Kupis, Mary Ann Largen, Sue Lenaerts, and Jackie MacMillan.

FAAR functionally disbanded in 1978 and later became the D.C. Area Feminist Alliance.
