= Lotus SmartSuite =

Productivity software

IBM Lotus SmartSuite
- Lotus SmartCenter icon and screenshot of the Lotus SmartCenter toolbar in Windows XP
- Developer: IBM
- Release: 1992; 34 years ago
- Final release: 9.8.6.1 / 5 February 2009
- Operating system: Microsoft Windows, OS/2
- Type: Office suite
- License: Proprietary
- Website: www.ibm.com/software/lotus/products/smartsuite/

SmartSuite is a discontinued office suite from Lotus Development. The company made versions of its office suite for IBM's OS/2 and Microsoft Windows.

== History ==
eComStation 1.0 included the OS/2 version of Smartsuite. It was an optional extra in later versions of eComStation. ArcaOS does not include Smartsuite, but is able to run it.

In 2007, IBM introduced a new office suite called IBM Lotus Symphony, unrelated to the Lotus Symphony integrated application suite that Lotus previously released.

In July 2012 the price for a user licence of Lotus SmartSuite 9.8 was US-$342.00 when purchased directly through the IBM website.

In May 2013, IBM announced the withdrawal of SmartSuite. Marketing of the product ended in June 2013, followed by all support ceasing in September 2014. IBM has also announced that there will be no replacement for SmartSuite.

== Components ==
The following applications are included in SmartSuite for Microsoft Windows:

- Lotus Word Pro — word processor; previously called Ami Pro; .lwp files
- Lotus 1-2-3 — spreadsheet; .123, .wk1, .wk3, .wk4 files
- Lotus Freelance Graphics — presentation software; .prz files
- Lotus Approach — relational database; .apr (data entry and reports), .dbf (database) files
- Lotus Organizer — personal information manager; .org, .or2, .or3, or4, or5 and or6 files
- Lotus SmartCenter — a toolbar that let users quickly access programs, calendar, Internet bookmarks, and other resources
- Lotus FastSite — web design software; .htm files
- Lotus ScreenCam — screen recording software for demos and tutorials; .scm, .exe, .wav files
- Lotus vCard & vCalendar Viewer — instant vCard and vCalendar viewer

== Version history ==
=== Microsoft Windows ===
- (1994) - SmartSuite 2.1 (Ami Pro 3.0, 1-2-3 4.0, Freelance Graphics 2.0, Approach 2.0 and Organizer 1.1)
- (1995) - SmartSuite 3.1 (Windows 3.11) — (Lotus 1-2-3 ver. 5, Approach 3.0, Ami Pro 3.1, Freelance Graphics 2.1, Organizer 2.1, ScreenCam 1.1).
- (1995) - SmartSuite 4.0 (Windows 3.11) -
- (1996) - SmartSuite 97 — Windows 95 and Windows NT 4.0 (1-2-3 97, Word Pro 97, Approach 97, Freelance Graphics 97, Organizer 97, ScreenCam 4.0 and SmartCenter)
- (1997) - SmartSuite 4.5 (Windows 3.11) - (Word Pro 97 Edition for Windows 3.1.)
- (1999) - SmartSuite Millennium Edition (9.5) — (Organizer 5.0, Fastsite release 2, WordPro Millennium Edition, 1-2-3 Millennium Edition, Freelance Graphics Millennium Edition, Approach Millennium Edition, SmartCenter and ScreenCam).
- (2002) October 2002: Latest version: SmartSuite Millennium Edition 9.8.
  - Fixpack 2 was the last version provided to the general public. All subsequent releases were only available to IBM Passport Advantage subscribers. Fixpack 3 was released in October 2005 and Fixpack 4 in October 2006. A subsequent Fixpack 5 was released in October 2007 followed by Fixpack 6 in December 2008, although these Fixpacks only contained changes to the Lotus Approach database software.

== Compatibility ==
Most SmartSuite programs are capable of reading and writing the corresponding Microsoft Office files. The Microsoft programs, however, are no longer capable of reading formats of the Lotus programs (the latest version that could was 2003). Furthermore, several of the SmartSuite components provide functionality not found in the Microsoft Office suite, for example Lotus FastSite and Lotus SmartCenter.

== IBM vs Microsoft ==
In his finding of facts in United States v. Microsoft, Judge Jackson determined that because of IBM's marketing of Lotus SmartSuite, and other alternatives to Microsoft products (like World Book electronic encyclopedia instead of Microsoft's Encarta), Microsoft "punished the IBM PC Company with higher prices, a late license for Windows 95, and the withholding of technical and marketing support."

Microsoft did not grant IBM OEM rights for Windows 95 until 15 minutes prior to the release of Windows 95, August 24, 1995. Because of this uncertainty, IBM machines were sold without Windows 95, while Compaq, HP, and other indulgent companies sold machines with Windows 95 from day one.

== See also ==
- IBM Lotus Symphony
- Lotus Symphony for DOS
- Comparison of office suites
- Lotus Multi-Byte Character Set (LMBCS)
