= Funny Creatures Lane =

Studio album by Jennifer Gentle
- Released: 2002
- Genre: Psychedelic rock, acid rock
- Label: SillyBoy Entertainment

Jennifer Gentle chronology
I Am You Are (2001)	Funny Creatures Lane (2002)	The Wrong Cage (2002)

Funny Creatures Lane is the second album by the Italian psychedelic rock band Jennifer Gentle, released in 2002.

== Track list ==
1. My Memories' Book
2. Locoweed
3. Wondermarsh
4. Mad House
5. Oui, c'est moi!
6. Floating Fraulein
7. Ectoplasmic Garden Party
8. The Stammering Ghost
9. Ultraviolet Lady Opera
10. Lord Hypnosis
11. Couple in Bed by a Green Flashing Light
12. The Wax-Dolls Parade

== Line Up ==
Marco Fasolo – voice, guitar

Alessio Gastaldello – drums

Isacco Maretto – guitar, accordion

Nicola Crivellari – bass, guitar
