= A New Astronomy =

Studio album by Jennifer Gentle
- Released: 2006
- Genre: Psychedelic rock, acid rock
- Label: Sub Pop Records, A Silent Place

Jennifer Gentle chronology
Valende (2005)	A New Astronomy (2006)	Sacramento Sessions/5 of 3 (2006)

A New Astronomy is the fourth album by the Italian psychedelic rock band Jennifer Gentle, released in 2006 by Sub Pop Records and A Silent Place.

== Track list ==
1. Lost Aurora
2. Hidden Flower
3. Red Apple Devil
4. Hollow Earth Theory
5. Sex Rituals Of The Dead
6. Hiss From Nowhere
7. The Cannibal Club
8. Church Of The Black Emptiness
9. “What Did You Say?”
10. A Classification Of Clouds
11. Music From Mars
12. Last Aurora
13. Me And Joe On The Moon
