= Valende =

Studio album by Jennifer Gentle
- Released: 2005
- Genre: Psychedelic rock, acid rock, avant-pop
- Label: Sub Pop Records

Jennifer Gentle chronology
The Wrong Cage (2002)	Valende (2005)	A New Astronomy (2006)

Valende is the third album by the Italian psychedelic rock band Jennifer Gentle, released in 2005 by Sub Pop Records.

== Track list ==
1. Universal daughter
2. I Do Dream You
3. Tiny holes
4. Circles of Sorrow
5. The Garden pt.1
6. Hessesopoa
7. The Garden pt.2
8. Golden drawings
9. Liquid Coffee
10. Nothing makes sense
