= PC/Computing =

- Volume 8, No. 6 cover
- Editor: Paul Somerson
- Frequency: Monthly
- Publisher: Ziff Davis
- Founder: Michael Kolowich
- Founded: 1988
- Final issue: 2002
- Country: United States
- Language: English
- ISSN: 0899-1847
- OCLC: 18025521

PC/Computing (later Ziff-Davis Smart Business) was a monthly Ziff Davis publication that for most of its run focused on publishing reviews of IBM-compatible (or "Wintel") hardware and software and tips and reference information for users of such software and hardware.

== History and profile ==
Established in 1988 under the guidance of founding publisher and columnist Michael Kolowich, the magazine was known for its irreverent style and annual "Windows Superguide" and "Notebook Torture Test" features. The latter feature involved baking, freezing, shaking, dropping, and splashing notebook computers from various manufacturers and then rating the machines based on which ones survived the "torture" and which ones failed. It also featured columns by editor-in-chief Paul Somerson (formerly of PC Magazine, another Ziff-Davis publication), John C. Dvorak, Gil Schwartz, and, for a time in its first few years, Penn Jillette. For some years, the magazine ran a regular column featuring an often-silly "debate" between Dvorak and Somerson. Michael Kolowich was the publisher and columnist until 1991. At its founding, the magazine was based in Burlington and Cambridge, Massachusetts, but relocated in 1991 to Foster City, California, near San Francisco.

The magazine changed its editorial focus from technology to Internet business in January 2000 and abandoned its original name shortly thereafter to try to capitalize on interest in the so-called "dot-com" boom of the late 1990s. When the technology bubble burst in mid-2000, the rechristened "Ziff-Davis Smart Business" in January 2000 lost its ad market. The magazine is the recipient of the National Magazine Award in the Personal Service category in 2000. It folded in 2002.
