= Lotus Marketplace =

Lotus Marketplace was a database program developed jointly by Lotus Development Corporation (as the software developer) and Equifax (as the information provider), announced on April 10, 1990, but cancelled shortly after on January 23, 1991, mainly due to massive protests and lawsuit threats, citing invasion of privacy. This program was rather large (even by today's standards), as it was supposed to be released on several CD-ROMs.

Lotus Marketplace was to be released in two editions, Lotus Marketplace: Business (containing information about businesses) and Lotus Marketplace: Households (containing information about peoples and households).

The Business edition of this program contained information about 7 million businesses in the United States, just like Yellow Pages, but could quickly and flexibly be searched. Unlike the Households edition, this edition was not so controversial and was released in October 1990, but was cancelled along with the Households edition; concerns about profitability were cited.

The Households edition of this program became infamous and the object of considerable opprobrium because it was supposed to contain private information about 120 million people and 80 million households in the United States. Information such as names, addresses, telephone numbers, demographic information, and prior purchasing behavior were contained in the program and could be searched quickly and flexibly. This program was strongly protested by many, who cited customer privacy issues (because by using this program telemarketers could get hundreds of names and addresses, and mass mail those addresses without addressees' consent). The backlash online was particularly intense, with a new Usenet newsgroup formed to discuss it. Information was circulated online about how to contact Lotus and request the removal of one's information from the database; more than 30,000 people would eventually do so. The decision to not release it was seen as a victory for online activism.

== See also ==
- Privacy
- Customer privacy
- Data privacy
- Computer ethics
- Telemarketing
