= Portsmouth Abbey School =

Catholic school in Portsmouth, Rhode Island, US

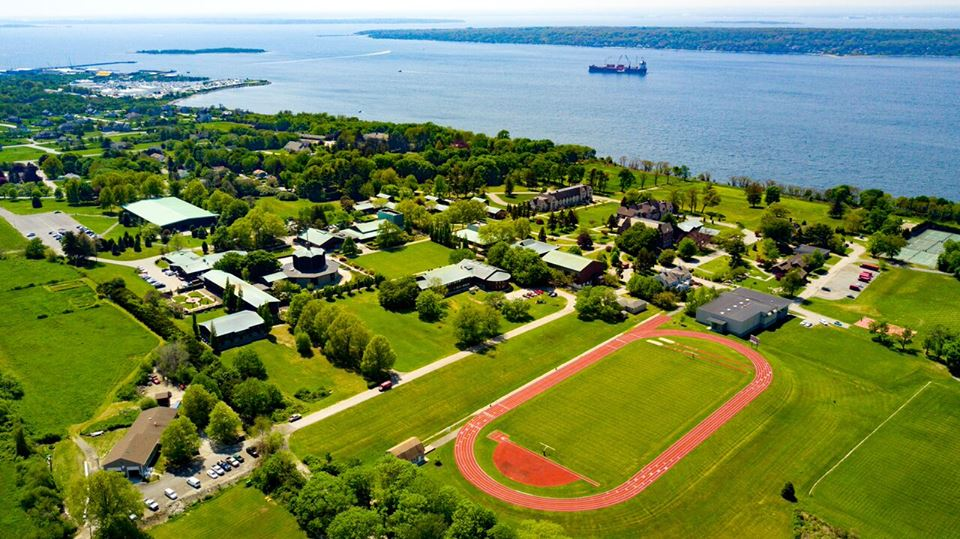

Location
- 285 Corys Lane; Portsmouth, (Newport County), Rhode Island 02871; United States; 41°36′12″N 71°16′19″W

Information
- Type: Private, day and boarding, college-prep
- Motto: Latin: Veritas (Truth)
- Religious affiliation: Roman Catholic (Benedictine)
- Established: 1926; 100 years ago
- Founder: John Hugh Diman
- Headmaster: Matthew Walter
- Grades: 9–12
- Gender: Coeducational
- Enrollment: 355 (2015–16)
- Average class size: 14
- Campus size: 525 acres (212 ha)
- Campus type: Suburban
- Colors: Red and black
- Song: "Portsmouth, Place of Fellowship"
- Athletics conference: Eastern Independent League
- Sports: 45 athletics teams in 16 sports
- Mascot: Raven
- Accreditation: New England Association of Schools and Colleges
- Publication: The Raven (Literary Magazine); Portsmouth Abbey School Alumni Bulletin
- Newspaper: The Beacon
- Yearbook: The Gregorian
- School fees: $63,050 per boarding year
- Website: portsmouthabbey.org

Portsmouth Abbey School is a coeducational Catholic, Benedictine boarding and day school for students in grades 9 to 12. Founded in 1926 by the English Benedictines, the school is located on a 525-acre campus in Portsmouth, along Rhode Island's Narragansett Bay.

== History ==
The school and monastery are located on land originally owned by the Freeborn family beginning in the 1650s. The land was later owned by the Anthony family, and in 1778 it was the site of the Battle of Rhode Island during the American Revolution. In 1864, Amos Smith, a Providence financier, built what is now known as the Manor House and created a gentleman's farm on the site with the help of architect Richard Upjohn. After buying the Manor House and surrounding land in 1918, Dom Leonard Sargent of Boston, a convert from the Episcopal Church, founded Portsmouth Priory on October 18, 1918. The priory was founded as, and remains, a house of the English Benedictine Congregation. It is one of only three American houses in the congregation, and maintains a unique connection with sister schools in England, including Ampleforth College and Downside School.

A parcel of the school's land is leased to The Aquidneck Club (formerly the Carnegie Abbey Club) where the student golf team practices and holds its interscholastic golf matches.

=== Modern ===
The school is often referred to as "the Abbey" and has students from 17 nations and 26 states. In 2006, the school installed a Vestas V47-660 kW wind turbine, the first such project in Rhode Island, to provide forty percent of the school's electricity.

== Notable art on campus ==
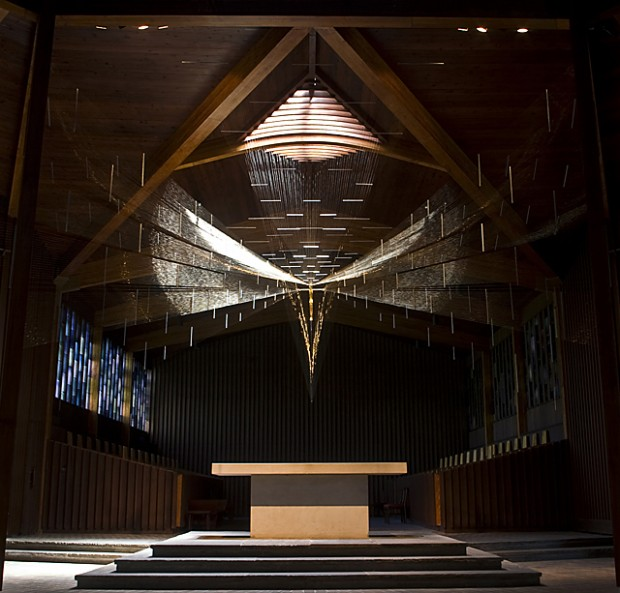
Richard Lippold's Trinity after Restoration by Newmans LTD

The Abbey's Church of St. Gregory the Great contains a wire sculpture titled Trinity, created by the late American sculptor Richard Lippold in 1960. The sculpture is made of a 22,000 foot web of gold plated wire surrounding a gold and silver Crucifix, created by Meinrad Burch. The sculpture underwent an award-winning restoration in 2009, carried out by Newmans’ Ltd., of Newport, Rhode Island.

== Notable people ==
=== Alumni ===
- Keith Botsford, 1944, American/European writer, collaborator with Saul Bellow, professor emeritus at Boston University and editor of News from the Republic of Letters.
- Christopher Buckley, 1970, American political satirist, son of William F. Buckley Jr.
- Robert Crichton, 1944, author of The Secret of Santa Vittoria and The Great Impostor
- R. F. Patrick Cronin, 1942, dean of faculty of medicine at McGill University (1972–1977).
- Jonathan DeFelice, 1965, president emeritus of Saint Anselm College; founder of the Association of Benedictine Colleges and Universities.
- William A. Dembski, transferred to University of Chicago in 1977 and received an honorary diploma in 1988, mathematician, philosopher, and theologian; proponent of concept of intelligent design.
- E.J. Dionne, 1969, Washington Post columnist and Senior Fellow at the Brookings Institution.
- John Gregory Dunne, 1950, novelist (True Confessions; The Red, White and Blue; Playland), screenwriter (A Star Is Born, co-authored with his wife, writer Joan Didion), and literary critic.
- Michael Egan, 1944, former U. S. associate attorney general (Carter Administration); former Georgia state senator; member of Georgia House of Representatives
- Phil English, 1974, U.S. representative (R-PA) 3rd District, 1995–2009.
- Benedict Fitzgerald, 1967, an American screenwriter who co-wrote the screenplay for The Passion of the Christ with Mel Gibson.
- Peter Fitzgerald, 1978, U.S. senator (R-IL), 1999–2005.
- Peter M. Flanigan, 1941, founder of Student Sponsor Partnership; financier; deputy campaign manager (1968) and assistant to President Richard M. Nixon.
- Richard Fremantle, 1954, American art historian.
- John Kerr, 1967, author of A Most Dangerous Method, editor.
- Michael Kolowich, 1970, documentary filmmaker and Internet entrepreneur.
- Alvin Lucier, 1949, composer of experimental music and sound installations.
- Michael J. Mauboussin, 1982, head of global consilient research at Counterpoint Global, part of Morgan Stanley; author of three books; adjunct professor of finance, Columbia Business School.
- Bishop William J. McCormack, 1941, former auxiliary bishop of the Archdiocese of New York (1987); former director of The Society of Propagation of the Faith (1990)
- Stryker McGuire. 1965, correspondent, bureau chief, chief of correspondents, Newsweek magazine; editor, LSE Research, London School of Economics and Political Science; London editor, Bloomberg Markets magazine.
- Terry McGuirk, 1969, chairman and CEO of MLB's Atlanta Braves; former CEO of Turner Broadcasting System, now vice chairman; recipient of Stuart Lewengrub Torch of Liberty Award from the Anti-Defamation League; Cable Hall of Fame, 2010.
- Thomas Mullen, 1992, novelist, recipient of the James Fenimore Cooper Prize for excellence in historical fiction; NPR Best Book of the Year, and has been nominated for two CWA Dagger Awards
- Alfonso A. Ossorio, 1934, Philippine-born abstract expressionist who worked closely with Jean Dubuffet and Jackson Pollock.
- John E. Pepper, Jr., 1956, former CEO and chairman of the executive committee of the Board of Directors of The Procter & Gamble Company and director of The Walt Disney Company; Vice President of finance and administration at Yale; senior fellow of the Yale Corporation.
- William Ruckelshaus, 1951, first Administrator of the Environmental Protection Agency, later became FBI Director and U.S. Deputy Attorney General
- Sean Spicer, 1989, former White House press secretary.
- Charlie Day, 1994, actor

=== Students who did not graduate ===
- Edward M. Kennedy, attended but did not graduate, U.S. Senator (D-MA) 1962–2009. Younger brother of President John F. Kennedy and Robert F. Kennedy.
- Robert F. Kennedy, attended but did not graduate, U.S. senator from New York, 65th U.S. Attorney General, brother of President John F. Kennedy.
- Deon Anderson, former NFL player. He transferred after his second year

== See also ==
- Catholic schools in the United States
- Higher education
- List of Rhode Island schools
- Parochial school
