= As-Easy-As =

Shareware 32-bit spreadsheet program

- Original authors: Trius, Inc.
- Initial release: mid 1980; 45 years ago
- Operating system: MS-DOS, Microsoft Windows
- Type: spreadsheet

As-Easy-As for DOS and As-Easy-As for Windows was a shareware 32-bit spreadsheet program developed in 1986 for MS-DOS and later for Microsoft Windows. The name is a play on the phrase "as easy as 1-2-3", a reference to the dominant MS-DOS spreadsheet at that time, Lotus 1-2-3 with which it competed for a fraction of the competitor's price. The program was developed and sold by TRIUS, Inc. (a company founded by David Schulz and Paris Karahalios a Shareware pioneer - not to be confused with Tritus, the makers of the Tritus SPF clone of the mainframe ISPF interface and editor). The company eventually branched out developing CAD (DraftChoice, StarFlic, ProtoCAD 3D, KeyCAD), GIS/Mapping software (Precision Mapping) and SDKs (MapPro, MaptiVate), no longer focusing on As-Easy-As.

== History ==
As-Easy-As is historically significant as one of the earliest and most useful shareware programs that competed with commercial software on the basis of both price and features. For small businesses and personal users, the price of Lotus 1-2-3 was prohibitive, and As-Easy-As provided basic spreadsheet functionality for about a tenth of the price. This paradigm of undercutting the spreadsheet market leader would be adopted by Borland's Quattro Pro (which was not released until 1990). Subsequent versions of As Easy As became as powerful as any MS-DOS spreadsheet. Like Quattro Pro, As-Easy-As combined some elements of the 1-2-3 user interface, while modernizing them. One such modernization is the use of pull-down menus.

Cell formulae are very similar to Lotus 1-2-3, including the letter-number addressing scheme (A1, B2, etc.) and the @function syntax (e.g.,@SUM(A1..A10) using the ".." range separator syntax also like Lotus 1-2-3.)

The product included a detailed electronic manual describing the spreadsheet's functions and some basic MS-DOS operations.

Updated versions of As-Easy-As were made available at frequent intervals. Because these new versions often included valuable new capabilities, users were encouraged to support the continuing development of the program. Supporters who paid for a license received a 200+ page printed, detailed user's manual. The graphic defaults were more attuned to science and engineering users than to business users. This enabled a user to rapidly create x-y graphs of data, whereas the major commercial spreadsheets of the DOS era (Lotus 1-2-3 and Quattro) by default produced more business-oriented graphs. Many calculation functions were appealing to the science and engineering markets, such as improved capabilities for regression analysis and matrix operations.

The program was translated by TRIUS, Inc. into Spanish, German, French, Portuguese, Italian and Chinese and at the height of its popularity it was being published locally in 10+ countries in the Americas, Europe, Asia and Australia. It was also private labelled for publishing and distribution by SoftKey International and could be purchased at many major retailers.

== End of development ==
On 3 November 2004, Trius discontinued the last version of As-Easy-As for DOS, and on 10 January 2006 the last version of As-Easy-As for Windows. Though copies of both programs were made available for downloading with free full licenses.

The earliest preserved historical version available on the Internet from the MS-DOS shareware era is version 3 from 1987.

== Awards ==
Some of the awards As-Easy-As received include:

- 1992 - Shareware Industry Awards, Best Application, Winner
- 1992 - PCM Reader's Best Award, Best Shareware Program
- 1998 - AS-EASY-AS for Win95/NT, Shareware Industry Award, Best Application
