= IBM Lotus Expeditor =

Software framework

- Developer: IBM
- Written in: Java
- Operating system: Cross-platform
- Type: OSGi Service Platform
- Website: www.ibm.com/software/lotus/products/expeditor/

IBM Lotus Expeditor is a software framework by IBM's Lotus Software division for the construction, integration, and deployment of "managed client applications", which are client applications that are deployed from, configured, and managed onto a desktop, usually by a remote server. The goal is to allow developers to create applications that take advantage of running on a local client, while having the same ease of maintenance as web-based applications.

== Description ==
There are several parts to Expeditor:

- Lotus Expeditor Client for Desktop is used for the running client applications on Microsoft Windows, Mac OS X and Linux. These applications can be written using a combination of OSGi, Java EE, and Eclipse Rich Client Platform (RCP) technologies, running on a Java virtual machine.
- Lotus Expeditor Client for Devices is a configuration of platform for Microsoft Windows Mobile devices and the Nokia E90 Communicator. This configuration of the platform includes the Eclipse embedded Rich Client Platform (eRCP) running on a Java ME virtual machine.
- Lotus Expeditor Server is used to deploy, configure and maintain applications running on Lotus Expeditor Clients. It runs on top of the IBM DB2 database management system and the Java EE-based IBM WebSphere Application Server. Expeditor Server is not necessary for Expeditor Client applications to run. Client applications can run standalone, and optionally exploit the services of the Lotus Expeditor Server for data synchronization, transactional messaging and automated, remote, application management.

In addition, Lotus Expeditor Toolkit is for developers to create Expeditor applications and create customized Expeditor runtimes. It runs on top of the Eclipse integrated development environment.

Lotus Software uses Expeditor in many of its own products, including Notes (from version 8), Sametime (from version 7.5), and Symphony.

== History ==
Lotus Expeditor has its roots in IBM's Pervasive Computing (PvC) initiatives. which were associated with the pursuit of ubiquitous computing. Early forms of Lotus Expeditor were first outlined publicly in 2001 in an article on IBM's Pervasive Computing Device Architecture. This architecture served as the basis for IBM PvC embedded software deliveries in many areas, including automotive telematics, industrial control, residential gateways, desktop screenphones, and handheld mobile devices.

In 2003, the core of the PvC Device Architecture, the OSGi Service Platform, was used in a refactoring of the Eclipse runtime to incubate what became Eclipse 3.0. This incubator project was referred to as Equinox. Eclipse 3.0 was released in 2004 as a refactored runtime (Rich Client Platform or RCP) and an integrated development environment (IDE) that exploited RCP.

Later in 2004, IBM announced Workplace Client Technology (WCT) for creating managed client applications targeted at desktops. WCT was an application of the PvC Device Architecture to desktops, which then included the RCP technologies. WCT also came with document editors that could read word processing documents, spreadsheets, and presentations in OpenDocument format.

Later that year, IBM rebranded the PvC Device Architecture as a platform called Workplace Client Technology, Micro Edition (WCTME). IBM took the existing Workplace Client Technology and renamed it Workplace Client Technology, Rich Client Edition (later Rich Edition or WCTRE).

IBM created a configuration of the WCTME platform, called Workplace Client Technology, Micro Edition—Enterprise Offering (WCTME-EO), as the first generally available product to support the construction and deployment of desktop applications for Workplace. WCT Micro Edition—Enterprise Offering had a smaller footprint than WCT Rich Edition by focusing only on the integration of line-of-business applications and, correspondingly, not including the document editors.

The names of the technologies continued to evolve in the next couple of years.

- WCT Rich Edition became known as the Workplace Managed Client.
- WCT Micro Edition—Enterprise Offering was briefly renamed Workplace Managed Client for WebSphere before it was released as WebSphere Everyplace Deployment for Windows and Linux. (WebSphere Everyplace Deployment referred to both client and server technologies.)

In 2006, IBM released Lotus Expeditor 6.1.2 and the company also started to de-emphasize the Workplace brand in favor of its existing Lotus and WebSphere brands. As part of this effort, it created the Expeditor brand within Lotus:

- WebSphere Everyplace Deployment became Lotus Expeditor.
- In particular, WebSphere Everyplace Deployment for Windows and Linux became Lotus Expeditor Client for Desktop.
- Workplace Client Technology, Micro Edition became Lotus Expeditor Client for Devices.
- The server components from WebSphere Everyplace Deployment products that dealt with managing desktop and mobile applications became Lotus Expeditor Server.
- Some of the technology in Workplace Managed Client, such as its document editors, were incorporated into Lotus Notes 8 and Lotus Symphony.

== See also ==
- IBM Service Management Framework
