= Red (text editor) =

OpenVMS text editing software

Red, usually in all caps as RED, is a screen editor for the VAX/VMS operating system using VT100 terminals. It was designed to be efficient in an interactive environment. RED's syntax is similar to TECO's. It supports cut/paste and user-written macros. RED is written in the STOIC programming language.
