= Jennifer Gentle =

Italian band

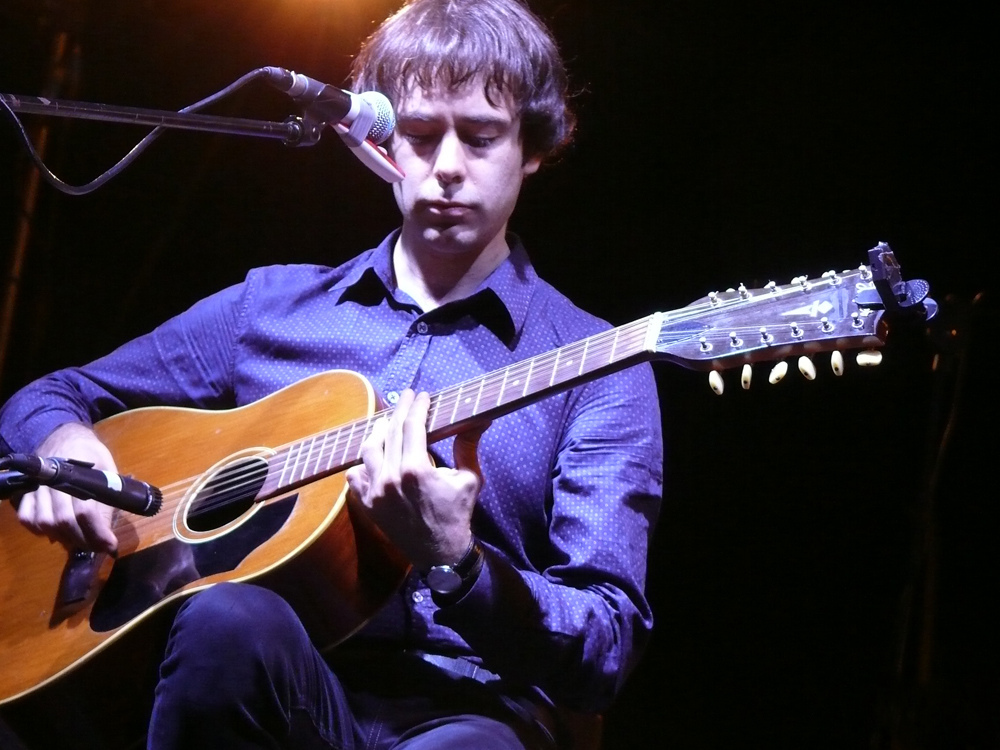
- Marco Fasolo leader of the italian band Jennifer Gentle.

Background information
- Origin: Padua, Veneto, Italy
- Genres: Psychedelic rock, acid rock
- Years active: 1999 – present
- Labels: SillyBoy Entertainment, Sub Pop Records, A Silent Place, Heron Recordings
- Members: Marco Fasolo (voice, guitar, bass, keyboards, percussion); Liviano Mos (keyboards, vocals, echoes, kazoo, percussion); Francesco Candura (voice, bass); Diego dal Bon (drums, percussion); Guido Giorgi (voice, guitar, percussion)
- Past members: Alessio Gastaldello

Jennifer Gentle is an Italian psychedelic rock band.

The band's name derives from a verse of the song "Lucifer Sam" by Syd Barrett.

== History ==
Jennifer Gentle was formed by Marco Fasolo and Alessio Gastaldello in early 2000, after the breakup of Marco’s previous band, Carcers. Later, these two young men teamed up with guitarist Isacco Maretto and bassist Nick Crivellari, which would complete the early stage of this Northern Italian rock group.

Jennifer Gentle imitated the influence of 60s psychedelic rock icon Syd Barrett (Pink Floyd), and recorded their first album I Am You Are in their own basement (Silly Boy Entertainment 2001). However, it wasn’t until their second basement-recording, Funny Creatures Lane (2002), that they began to gain attention from radio stations across the US and Britain. They began touring with Acid Mothers Temple’s Kawabata Makoto and cut a session with WFMU, releasing the tour on a live album, The Wrong Cage in 2002. When Crivellari left Jennifer Gentle, Paolo Mioni (guitar), Liviano Mos (keyboards) and Francesco Candura of Rivulets (bass) were welcomed into the band as live stage members.

In February 2004, Jennifer Gentle became the first Italian band to be signed to Sub Pop records. They released their third studio album, Valende, which was recorded in the same basement on the outskirts of Padova, Italy, in 2004. Marco and Alessio are responsible for all instrumentation and vocals on their albums.

This Italian duo is known to have incorporated instruments such as kazoos, cow bells, toy glockenspiel, bowed guitars, old Bontempi air organs, plastic flutes, chains and clocks, and deflating balloons ("I Do Dream You", Valende).

They were the first European band to sign to Sub Pop Records.

== Discography ==
- 2001: I Am You Are
- 2002: Funny Creatures Lane
- 2002: The Wrong Cage
- 2004: Valende
- 2006: A New Astronomy
- 2006: Sacramento Sessions/5 of 3
- 2007: The Midnight Room
- 2008: Evanescent Land
- 2008: Live in the House of God
- 2010: Concentric
- 2019: Jennifer Gentle

== Appearances ==
- Jennifer Gentle made an appearance at the May Day Music Festival at Hamilton College on April 30, 2005. Other featured artists they shared the stage with included Dead Meadow, Rainer Maria, Tim Reynolds, Virginia Coalition, and The Pharcyde.
- At the 2005 SXSW festival, Jennifer Gentle shared the stage with fellow Sub Pop artists Robyn Hitchcock The Thermals, and Sleater-Kinney (2005).
