= The Midnight Room =

Studio album by Jennifer Gentle
- Released: 2007
- Genre: Psychedelic rock, acid rock
- Length: 36:49
- Label: Sub Pop Records

Jennifer Gentle chronology
Sacramento Sessions/5 of 3 (2006)	The Midnight Room (2007)	Evanescent Land (2008)

The Midnight Room is the fifth studio album by the Italian psychedelic rock band Jennifer Gentle, released in 2007.

== Track listing ==
1. Twin Ghosts
2. Telephone Ringing
3. It's In Her Eyes
4. Take My Hand
5. The Ferryman
6. Electric Princess
7. Quarter To Three
8. Mercury Blood
9. Granny's House
10. Come Closer
