= Extensible Forms Description Language =

- Filename extension: .xfdl
- Internet media type: application/xml, text/xml (deprecated)
- Uniform Type Identifier (UTI): public.xml
- Developed by: World Wide Web Consortium
- Type of format: Markup language
- Standard: 4.0

Extensible Forms Description Language (XFDL) is a high-level computer language that facilitates defining a form as a single, stand-alone object using elements and attributes from the Extensible Markup Language (XML). Technically, it is a class of XML originally specified in a World Wide Web Consortium (W3C) Note. See Specifications below for links to the current versions of XFDL. XFDL It offers precise control over form layout, permitting replacement of existing business/government forms with electronic documents in a human-readable, open standard.

In addition to precision layout control, XFDL provides multiple page capabilities, step-by-step guided user experiences, and digital signatures. XFDL also provides a syntax for in-line mathematical and conditional expressions and data validation constraints as well as custom items, options, and external code functions. Current versions of XFDL (see Specifications below) are capable of providing these interactive features via open standard markup languages including XForms, XPath, XML Schema and XML Signatures.

XFDL not only supports multiple digital signatures, but the signatures can apply to specific sections of a form and prevent changes to signed content.

These advantages to XFDL led large organizations such as the United States Army and Air Force to migrate to XFDL from using forms in other formats. Later, though, the lack of portable software capable of creating XFDL led them to investigate moving away from it. The Army migrated to Adobe fillable PDFs in 2014.
