= Lotus Approach =

Relational database management system

IBM Lotus Approach
- Developer: Lotus Development
- Stable release: 9.8.6 (fixpack 6) / 2008
- Operating system: Microsoft Windows
- Type: database management system
- License: Proprietary
- Website: www.ibm.com

Lotus Approach is a relational database management system included in Lotus SmartSuite for Microsoft Windows.

As a start-up company, Approach was formed in 1991 and won over 30 awards the first year, including "best of show" at Comdex. The program was considered the first "end-user relational database" that did not introduce yet another file format.

Approach was sold to Lotus Development in 1994; Lotus was subsequently purchased by IBM.

== See also ==
- Comparison of office suites
