= IBM Lotus Foundations =

Software

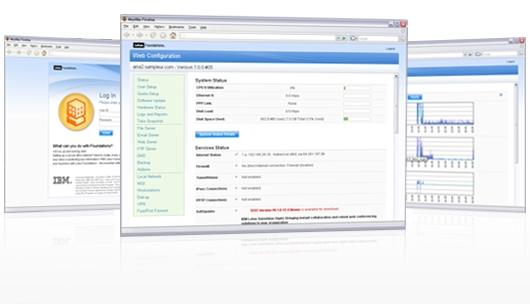
Lotus Foundations

Lotus Foundations was a bundled small-business server solutions package by IBM from 2008-2013. The package includes Lotus Domino, directory services, file management, firewall, backup, web hosting and various other productivity tools.

== History ==
The product's release was a direct result of IBM's acquisition of Net Integration Technologies, which has been integrated into the IBM Lotus division. The original pre-acquisition product was based on the Net Integrator Mark 1 server appliance and its NITIX Autonomic Linux Server OS.

Lotus Foundations was introduced to market as a hardware appliance late in 2008, and a software-only appliance was also made available. In 2010 Lotus Foundations hardware appliance was discontinued and software-only appliance followed suit in February 2011. In June 2011, however, Lotus Foundations software appliance was reinstated on sale, but IBM does not sell it directly anymore, distributing it through selected Business Partners instead.

IBM Lotus Foundations products were withdrawn from marketing on March 14, 2013 and are no longer available for purchase. Support for IBM Lotus Foundations products was withdrawn on September 30, 2014.

== Lotus Domino ==
Lotus Domino is an IBM server product that provides enterprise-grade e-mail, collaboration capabilities, and custom application platform. It can be used as an application server for Lotus Notes applications and/or as a web server. It also has a built-in database system in the NSF format.

== Firewall ==
The Lotus Foundations firewall is GUI-based, designed for ease of use and features auto-configuration of firewall settings. The firewall allows incoming FTP (active and passive Mode), HTTP, HTTPS and SMTP while allowing outgoing DNS, FTP, HTTP, HTTPS and telnet as well as the IMAP, POP3 and SMTP mail protocols.
