= Lotus Development =

American technology company (1982–2018)

Lotus Development Corporation
- Type: Public
- Industry: Computer software
- Founded: 1982; 44 years ago
- Defunct: 1995; 31 years ago
- Fate: Acquired by IBM in 1995; rebranded to Lotus Software in 2003; assets sold to HCL Technologies in 2018
- Headquarters: Cambridge, Massachusetts, U.S.
- Products: Lotus 1-2-3; Lotus Agenda; Lotus Connections; Lotus Domino; Lotus Domino Web Access; Lotus Expeditor; Lotus Forms; Lotus Freelance Graphics; Lotus Improv; Lotus Magellan; Lotus Manuscript; Lotus Notes; Lotus Notes Traveler; Lotus Quickplace; Lotus Quickr; Lotus Sametime; Lotus SmartSuite; Lotus Symphony; Lotus Word Pro; LotusWorks; Lotus Foundations; IBM Lotus Web Content Management
- Parent: HCL
- Website: Official website

Lotus Development Corporation was an American software company based in Massachusetts. Lotus is best known for the Lotus 1-2-3 spreadsheet application, the first feature-heavy, user-friendly, reliable, and WYSIWYG-enabled product to become available in the early days of the IBM PC. It became that platform's killer application and is widely considered one of the reasons the PC became successful.

Lotus' next major success was 1989's Lotus Notes, a system that combined the features of email and groupware in a single product. Developed in partnership with Ray Ozzie's Iris Associates, Notes quickly became a corporate success, taking business away from older products running on mainframes, like IBM OfficeVision. IBM purchased Lotus in 1995 for US$3.5 billion (equivalent to $6.7 billion in 2025), primarily to acquire Lotus Notes.

IBM maintained the brand and division, renaming it Lotus Software in 2003, until the 2012–13 time frame, although by that time only two products, Notes and Lotus Domino, were being actively marketed. Domino was a modernized Notes server with additional collaboration features that competed with products like SharePoint. Although successful for a time, on December 6, 2018, IBM announced the sale of Notes and Domino to HCL for US$1.8 billion (equivalent to $2.3 billion in 2025).

== History ==
Lotus was founded in 1982 by partners Mitch Kapor and Jonathan Sachs with backing from Ben Rosen. By the end of that year the company offered Executive Briefing System, presentation software for the Apple II, written by Kapor and Todd Agulnick. Kapor founded Lotus after leaving his post as head of development at VisiCorp, the distributors of the VisiCalc spreadsheet, and selling all his rights to VisiPlot and VisiTrend to VisiCorp.

Shortly after Kapor left VisiCorp, he and Sachs produced an integrated spreadsheet and graphics program. Even though IBM and VisiCorp had a collaboration agreement whereby VisiCalc was being shipped simultaneously with the PC, Lotus had a superior product. Lotus released Lotus 1-2-3 on January 26, 1983. The name referred to the three ways the product could be used, as a spreadsheet, graphing tool, and database manager. The last two functions were less often used in practice, but 1-2-3 was the most powerful spreadsheet program available.

Lotus was almost immediately successful, becoming the world's third largest microcomputer software company in 1983 with $53 million in sales in its first year mostly through Softsel and ComputerLand, compared to its business plan forecast of $1 million in sales. In 1982, Jim Manzi — a graduate of Colgate University and The Fletcher School of Law and Diplomacy — came to Lotus as a management consultant with McKinsey & Company and became an employee four months later. In October 1983, the company filed its initial public offering. In October 1984, Manzi was named president of Lotus, and in April 1986, he was appointed CEO, succeeding Kapor. In July of that same year, he also became chairman of the board. Manzi remained at the head of Lotus until 1995.

=== Dominance ===
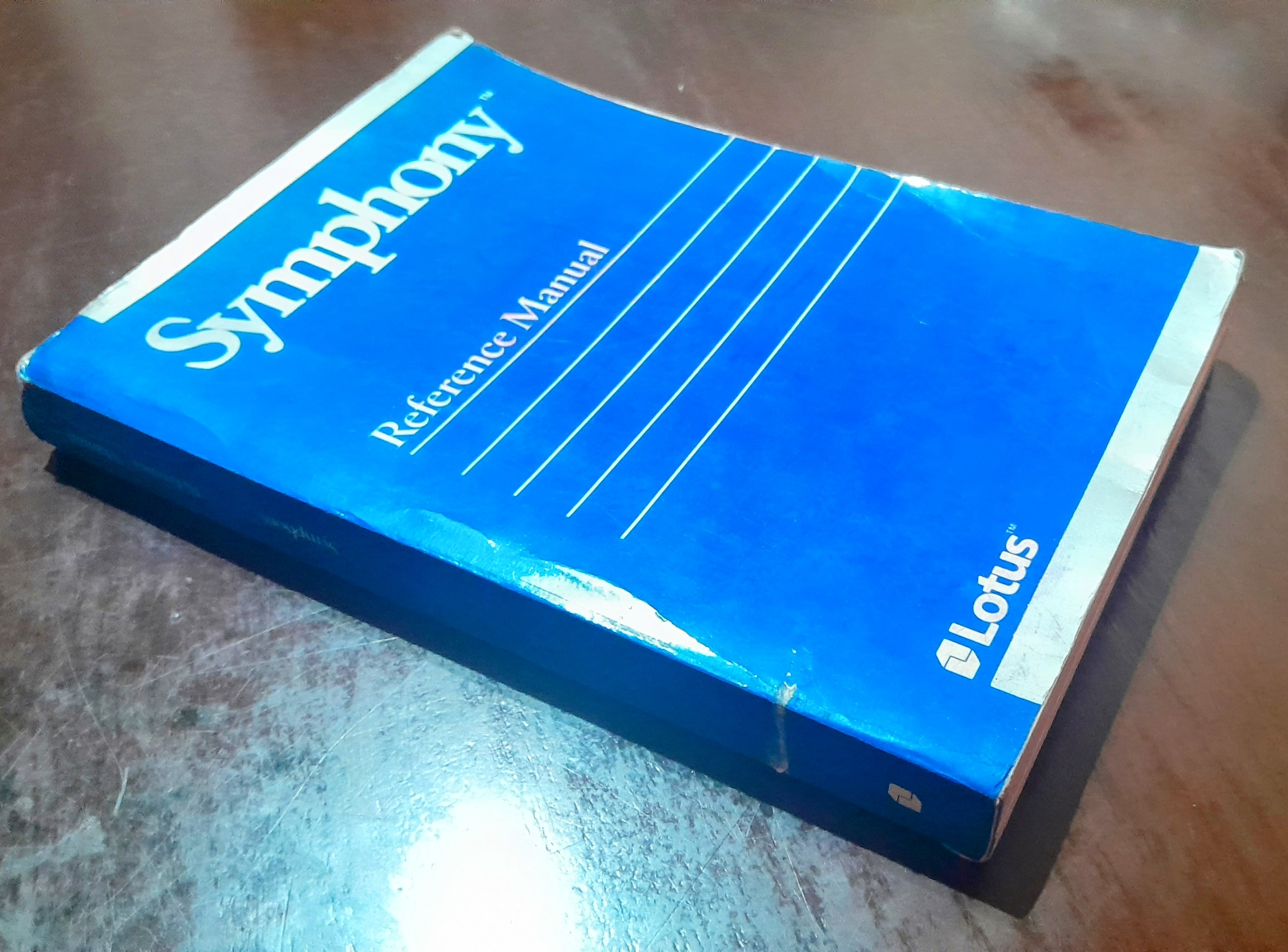
A book of Lotus Symphony (DOS) Reference Manual, published in 1984

As the popularity of the personal computer grew, Lotus quickly came to dominate the spreadsheet market. Lotus introduced other office products such as Ray Ozzie's Symphony in 1984 and the Jazz office suite for the Apple Macintosh computer in 1985. Jazz did very poorly in the market (in Guy Kawasaki's book The Macintosh Way, Lotus Jazz was described as being so bad, "even the people who pirated it returned it"). Also in 1985, Lotus bought Software Arts and discontinued its VisiCalc program.

By that year Forrester Research considered Lotus, Ashton-Tate, Microsoft, and Borland the "Big Four" of personal computer software. Softletter estimated that in 1986 the "Big Three" of Lotus (9%, more than $275 million), Microsoft (8%), and Ashton-Tate (6%) together had 23% of total revenue of the top 100 microcomputer software companies. Of the 15 million Americans who used a personal computer in their job, a quarter used 1-2-3. Computer Intelligence estimated in 1987 that Lotus had 85% of the Fortune 1000 PC financial analysis market, with Microsoft second at 6%. It also estimated a 20% share of the presentation software market, second to Ashton-Tate and ahead of Microsoft's 6%. A 1987 Computerworld survey gave Lotus a B grade for technology and product support, B+ for management, C+ for customer relations, and B− for marketing. Customers said that the company was slow to upgrade products, documentation and seminars were good but telephone support was poor, management had succeeded in defeating many competitors, customer relations had improved but copy protection was still the top complaint, and Jazz's failure showed that Lotus's ability to market products other than 1-2-3 and Symphony was unknown.

In the late 1980s, Lotus developed Lotus Magellan, a file management and indexing utility. In this period, Manuscript, a word processor, Lotus Agenda, an innovative personal information manager (PIM) which flopped, and Improv, a ground-breaking modeling package (and spreadsheet) for the NeXT platform, were released. Improv also flopped, and none of these products significantly impacted the market.

=== "Look and feel" lawsuits ===
Lotus was involved in several lawsuits, of which the most significant was the "look and feel" cases which started in 1987. Lotus sued Paperback Software and Mosaic for copyright infringement, false and misleading advertising, and unfair competition over their low-cost clones of 1-2-3, VP Planner and Twin, and sued Borland over its Quattro spreadsheet. This led Richard Stallman, founder of the Free Software Foundation, to found the League for Programming Freedom (LPF) and hold protests outside Lotus Development offices. Paperback and Mosaic lost and went out of business; Borland won and survived. The LPF filed an amicus curiae brief in the Borland case.

=== Diversification and acquisition by IBM ===
Lotus began its diversification from the desktop software business with its 1984 strategic founding investment in Ray Ozzie's Iris Associates, the creator of its Lotus Notes groupware platform. As a result of this early speculative move, Lotus gained significant experience in network-based communications years before other competitors in the PC world had even started thinking about networked computing or the Internet. Lotus initially brought Lotus Notes to market in 1989 and later reinforced its market presence by acquiring cc:Mail in 1991.

During the 1980s Lotus remained dependent on retail customers of 1-2-3 and Symphony. Computerworld noted in 1987 that "the company has announced or acquired nearly a dozen products ... over the last two years, but none accounts for more than a few percentage points of the company's yearly revenue". The magazine added that, according to Lotus, "The spreadsheet is a hook ... into other major application markets such as word processing, data base management, graphics and communications". That year Manzi said that Lotus would release software for IBM's OS/2 operating system before Microsoft Windows, and his company announced 1-2-3 for IBM mainframe.

In the 1990s, to compete with Microsoft's Windows applications, Lotus had to buy in products such as Ami Pro (word processor), Approach (database), and Threadz, which became Lotus Organizer. Several applications (1-2-3, Freelance Graphics, Ami Pro, Approach, and Lotus Organizer) were bundled together under the name Lotus SmartSuite. Although SmartSuite was bundled cheaply with many PCs and may initially have been more popular than Microsoft Office, Lotus quickly lost its dominance in the desktop applications market with the transition from 16- to 32-bit applications running on Windows 95. In large part due to its focusing much of its development resources on a suite of applications for the commercially unsuccessful OS/2, Lotus was late in delivering its suite of 32-bit products and failed to capitalize on the transition to the new version of Windows. The last significant new release was the SmartSuite Millennium Edition, released in 1999.

All new development of the suite was ended in 2000, with ongoing maintenance being moved overseas. The last update release was in 2014.

In 1994, Lotus acquired Iris Associates. By then large companies bought Notes for their employees, Lotus's dominant groupware position attracted IBM, which needed to make a strategic move away from host-based messaging products and to establish a stronger presence in client-server computing, but it also soon attracted competition from Microsoft Exchange Server. In the second quarter of 1995, IBM launched a hostile bid with a $60-per-share tender offer when Lotus' stock was only trading at $32. Jim Manzi looked for potential white knights and forced IBM to increase its bid to $64.50 per share for a $3.5 billion buyout of Lotus in July 1995. On October 11, 1995, Manzi announced his resignation from what had become the Lotus Development division of IBM; he left with stock worth $78 million.

=== Assimilation of name, website, and branding ===
Logo following rebrand to Lotus Software in 2003

While IBM allowed Lotus to develop, market, and sell its products under its own brand name, a restructuring in January 2001 brought it more in line with its parent company, IBM. IBM moved vital marketing and management functions from Cambridge, Massachusetts, to IBM's New York office.

Gradually, the Lotus.com website changed its "About us" section to eliminate references to "Lotus Development Corporation". The Lotus.com web page in 2001 clearly showed the company as "Lotus Development Corporation" with "a word from its CEO" by 2002, the "About us" section was removed from its site menu, and the Lotus logo was replaced with the IBM logo. By 2003 an "About Lotus" link returned to the Lotus.com page on its sidebar, but this time identifying the company as "Lotus software from IBM" and showing in its contact information "Lotus Software, IBM Software Group". By 2008 the Lotus.com domain name stopped showing a standalone site, instead redirecting to www.ibm.com/software/lotus, and in 2012 the site discontinued all reference to Lotus Software in favor of IBM Collaboration Solutions.

IBM discontinued development of IBM Lotus Symphony in 2012 with the final release of version 3.0.1, moving future development effort to Apache OpenOffice, and donating the source code to the Apache Software Foundation. Later that year, IBM announced it was discontinuing the Lotus brand and on March 13, 2013, IBM announced the availability of IBM Notes and Domino 9.0 Social Edition, replacing prior versions of IBM Lotus Notes and IBM Lotus Domino and marking the end of Lotus as an active brand.

On December 6, 2018, IBM announced the selling of Lotus Software/Domino to HCL for $1.8 billion.

== Corporate culture ==
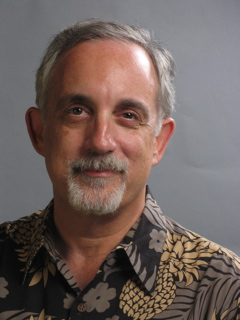
Mitch Kapor

Lotus's first employee was Janet Axelrod, who created the Human Resources organization and played a central role with senior management, she eventually hired Freada Klein as the first director of employee relations.

In 1995 Lotus had over 4,000 employees worldwide; IBM's acquisition of Lotus was greeted with apprehension by many Lotus employees, who feared that the corporate culture of "Big Blue" would smother their creativity. To the surprise of many employees and journalists, IBM initially adopted a very hands-off, laissez-faire attitude toward its new acquisition.

What most did not know was that Lotus president, Jim Manzi, made IBM president Lou Gerstner sign a two year moratorium that said he would make no sweeping changes to Lotus operations for a minimum of two years. It gave a false sense of acceptance of the modern corporate culture and the minute the moratorium was up, the big, blue, bureaucratic culture quickly overwhelmed it.

However, by 2000 the assimilation of Lotus was well underway. While the mass employee defections that IBM feared did not materialize, many long-time Lotus employees did complain about the transition to IBM's culture—IBM's employee benefits programs, in particular, were singled out as inferior to Lotus's very progressive programs.

Lotus's headquarters in Cambridge were initially divided into two buildings, the Lotus Development Building (LDB) on the banks of the Charles River and the Rogers Street building, adjacent to the CambridgeSide Galleria. However, in 2001, President and General Manager Al Zollar decided to keep the lease of LDB. The subsequent migration of employees across the street (and into home offices) generally coincided with the final departure of employees from the company. Later, IBM's offices at 1 Rogers St supported mobile employees, the Watson Research Center on User interface, and IBM DataPower.

== Products ==
IBM sponsored the "Lotus Greenhouse", a community web site featuring software from IBM and its business partners.

=== Discontinued products ===
- Lotus Connections
- Lotus Domino
- Lotus Domino Web Access
- Lotus Expeditor
- Lotus Forms
- Lotus Foundations
- LotusLive
- Lotus Mashups
- Lotus Notes
- Lotus Notes Traveler
- IBM Lotus Quickr, which replaces Lotus QuickPlace
- Lotus Sametime
- IBM Lotus Web Content Management
- Lotus SmartSuite including Lotus 1-2-3, Lotus Word Pro, Lotus Freelance Graphics, Lotus Approach, Lotus Organizer (discontinued on 30-Sep-2014)
- Lotus Domino Document Manager (discontinued on 30-Sep-2012)
- Lotus Agenda
- Lotus cc:Mail
- Lotus HAL
- Lotus Impress
- Lotus Improv
- Lotus Jazz
- Lotus Magellan
- Lotus Manuscript
- Lotus Marketplace
- Lotus Symphony (DOS version)
- IBM Lotus Symphony
- LotusWorks (formerly AlphaWorks, bought from Alpha Software in May 1990)
