= Lotus Organizer =

Personal information manager software

IBM Lotus Organizer
- Developer: Lotus Development
- Stable release: 6.1 / 2003
- Operating system: Microsoft Windows
- Type: Personal information manager
- License: Proprietary
- Website: www.ibm.com

Lotus Organizer is a discontinued personal information manager (PIM). Initially developed by Threadz, a small British software house, reaching version 3.0, it was subsequently acquired by Lotus Development Corporation and marketed as a Windows-based replacement for Lotus Agenda. For several years it was the unquestioned market leader until it was gradually overtaken by Microsoft Outlook.

Organizer used the skeuomorphic ″leather-bound personal organizer″ graphical metaphor for its user interface.

== Status ==
On 14 May 2013, IBM announced the immediate "withdrawal and discontinuance of support" of Lotus SmartSuite, Lotus Organizer and Lotus 123.

Version 6.1 was the last version. It supported Windows 2000, Windows XP, Windows Vista, Windows 7, and Windows 10.

== Versions ==
=== Microsoft Windows ===
Organizer was a part of Lotus SmartSuite, but was also sold as a single application. The latest releases of SmartSuite did not include the current version of Organizer; it was sold separately only.

Versions up to 2 were 16-bit programs. Later versions are 32-bit programs.

Version	File format	Year	Included in
1	.org	1992	
1.1	.org	1993?	
2	.or2	1994	
97 (3.1)	.or3	1997	SmartSuite 97
97 GS (4.0)	.or4	1997	
4.1	.or4	1998	SmartSuite Millennium Edition Release 9
5	.or5	1999	SmartSuite Millennium Edition Release 9.5–9.8.x
6.0	.or6	1999	
2.12	.or2	1999	Y2K Compliant, Free Distro for existing users
6.1	.or6	2003	

=== IBM OS/2 ===
The first OS/2 version was released in 1998. Until then, the Windows 16-bit version had been used. The last version is 1.7 from 2001. Later revisions of SmartSuite did not upgrade Organizer, although some fixes have been made.

Organizer for OS/2 uses the .or4 file format. This means that it cannot exchange data files with the later Windows versions, other than by importing and exporting data.

The features and user interface for Organizer for OS/2 are similar to that of Organizer 97 for Windows. It lacks later improvements, such as importing and exporting vCard and iCalendar files, and synchronisation with PDAs.

=== Mac OS ===
Lotus Organizer 97 GS was released for classic Mac OS in 1997 with features similar to the Windows version, including integration with Lotus Notes calendars and address books.

== See also ==
- List of personal information managers
