= Concentric (album) =

Studio album by Jennifer Gentle
- Released: 2010
- Genre: Psychedelic rock, experimental
- Length: 43:13
- Label: A Silent Place

Jennifer Gentle chronology
Live in the House of God (2008)	Concentric (2010)

Concentric is the sixth studio album by the Italian psychedelic rock band Jennifer Gentle, released in 2010 by A Silent Place.

== Track list ==
1. Key
2. Land
3. Neon
4. Melt
5. Hunt
6. Scar
7. Halos
8. Yell
