= Lotus Manuscript =

Word processor

- Original author: Lotus Software
- Initial release: 1986
- Final release: 2.1 / 1989
- Operating system: MS-DOS
- Platform: Intel 286

Lotus Manuscript is a discontinued MS-DOS-based word processor from Lotus Development first released in 1986. The software was distributed on eight 5¼" diskettes and retailed for US$495.

== Features ==
First released in 1986, Lotus Manuscript was one of the first MS-DOS word processors and being sophisticated geared toward scientific technical writing. It features easy table editing, the ability to easily edit and print mathematical equations, and handled very complicated documents (other than a brief). It also includes footnoting, document tracking, import from Lotus 1-2-3, and mailmerge. Version 2 adds macro and downloadable font support.

The word processor had two modes: structured (outline) which is used in technical writing, and unstructured.

Manuscript 2.0 was released in 1988 and added a Microlytics-based thesaurus, conditional mail merges, multi-line headers and footers. The Lotus 1-2-3 like backslash commands were replaced with 40 markers. in addition to distribution on 5¼" diskettes, 3½" diskettes were made available.

Manuscript 2.1 was released in 1989 with further improvements to the software.

Many of the features of Manuscript were later copied by Wordperfect and Word, but the ability to easily write scientific manuscripts on a computer has not yet been accomplished.
