= Mitch Kapor =

American entrepreneur (born 1950)

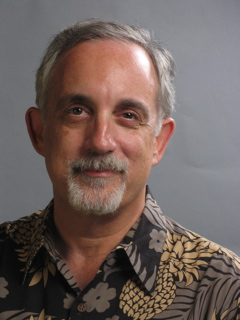
- Kapor in 2005
- Born: Mitchell David Kapor; November 1, 1950 (age 76); Brooklyn, New York, U.S.
- Education: Yale University (BA); Beacon College of Boston (MS); MIT Sloan School of Management
- Occupation: Entrepreneur
- Known for: Lotus 1-2-3 and co-founder of The Electronic Frontier Foundation
- Spouse(s): Ellen M. Poss (divorced); Freada Kapor Klein
- Children: 2
- Mitch Kapor's voice Recorded November 2014

Mitchell David Kapor (/ˈkeɪpɔːr/ KAY-por; born November 1, 1950) is an American entrepreneur best known for his work as an application developer in the early days of the personal computer software industry, later founding Lotus Development, where he was instrumental in developing the Lotus 1-2-3 spreadsheet. He left Lotus in 1986. In 1990 with John Perry Barlow and John Gilmore, he co-founded the Electronic Frontier Foundation, and served as its chairman until 1994. In 2003, he became the founding chair of the Mozilla Foundation, creator of the open source web browser Firefox. Kapor has been an investor in the personal computing industry, and supporter of social causes via Kapor Capital and the Kapor Center. He serves on the board of SMASH, a non-profit founded by his wife, Freada Kapor Klein, to help underrepresented scholars hone their STEM knowledge while building personal networks and skills for careers in tech and the sciences.

== Early life and education ==
Kapor was born to a Jewish family in Brooklyn, New York, and raised in Freeport, New York on Long Island, where he graduated from high school in 1967. He received a B.A. from Yale College in 1971 and studied psychology, linguistics, and computer science in an interdisciplinary major, also attending the Boston-based Beacon College, which had a satellite campus in Washington, D.C. at the time. He began a master's degree at the MIT Sloan School of Management, in 1979 but dropped out and did not finish his master's until 2025, though he served on the faculty of the MIT Media Lab and the University of California, Berkeley School of Information, in the interim.

== Career ==
=== Lotus ===
Kapor and his business partner Jonathan Sachs founded Lotus Development in 1982 with backing from Ben Rosen. Lotus' first product was presentation software for the Apple II known as Lotus Executive Briefing System. Kapor founded Lotus after leaving his post as head of development at VisiCorp, the distributors of the VisiCalc spreadsheet, and selling all his rights to VisiPlot and VisiTrend to VisiCorp.

Shortly after Kapor left VisiCorp, he and Sachs produced an integrated spreadsheet and graphics program. Even though IBM and VisiCorp had a collaboration agreement whereby VisiCalc was being shipped simultaneously with the PC, Lotus had a clearly superior product. Lotus released Lotus 1-2-3 on January 26, 1983. Its name referred to the three ways the product could be used: as a spreadsheet, graphics package, and database manager. In practice, the latter two functions were less often used, but 1-2-3 was the most powerful spreadsheet program available.

Lotus was almost immediately successful, becoming the world's third-largest microcomputer software company in 1983 with US$53 million (equivalent to $143.8 million in 2025) in sales in its first year, compared to its business plan forecast of $1 million. Jerome Want says:

Under founder and CEO Mitch Kapor, Lotus was a company with few rules and fewer internal bureaucratic barriers... Kapor decided that he was no longer suited to running a company, and [in 1986] he replaced himself with Jim Manzi.

=== Digital rights activism ===
Kapor co-founded the Electronic Frontier Foundation in 1990 and was its chairman until 1994. EFF defends civil liberties in the digital world and works to ensure that rights and freedoms are enhanced and protected as the use of technology grows.

Kapor attended the first Wikimania in 2005.

=== Investments ===
Kapor was the founding investor in UUNET, one of the first, and the largest among, early Internet service providers; in RealNetworks, the Internet's first streaming media company; and in Linden Lab, maker of the first successful virtual world, Second Life. He was also founding chair of the Commercial Internet eXchange (CIX).

In 2003, he became the founding chair of the Mozilla Foundation, creator of the open source web browser Firefox.

He serves on the advisory board of the Sunlight Foundation. In May 2009, after founder Susan P. Crawford joined the Obama administration, Kapor took over chairmanship of OneWebDay—the "Earth Day for the internet". In 1996, the Computer History Museum named him a Museum Fellow "for his development of Lotus 1-2-3, the first major software application for the IBM PC". He founded the Mitchell Kapor Foundation to support his philanthropic interests in environmental health.

As an active angel investor, Kapor participated in the initial rounds of Dropcam, Twilio, Asana, Cleanify and Uber.

=== Kapor Center and Kapor Capital ===
Kapor founded the Kapor Center for Social Impact (the KaporCenter) in 2000 as an institution focused on tech inclusion and social impact. The institution's mission is to invest in social and financial capital in vital non-profit organizations.

A part of the Kapor Center, Kapor Capital is its venture capital arm, and has operated since 2011. As of 2018, it has made over 160 investments, primarily in information technology seed-stage startups, with a particular focus on diversity.

Since 2016, the Kapor Center for Social Impact and Kapor Capital have been located in the Uptown neighborhood of Oakland.

=== Diversity in technology ===
In August 2015, Mitch and Freada Kapor announced they would invest $40 million over three years to accelerate their work to make the tech ecosystem more inclusive.

In addition to his roles at Kapor Capital and Kapor Center, Mitch currently serves on the board of SMASH, whose mission is to enhance equal opportunity in education and the workplace, and sits on the advisory board of Generation Investment Management, a firm whose vision is to embed sustainability into the mainstream capital markets. Like the two Kapor namesake organizations, SMASH is also located in Uptown Oakland.

== Personal life ==
He has a daughter and son with his first wife.

Kapor's second wife is Freada Kapor Klein and resides in Oakland and Healdsburg, California. Both served on the board of trustees of the Summer Science Program from 2004 to 2006. He was a student of the program in 1966.

== Awards and honors ==
- 1985 – Golden Plate Award of the American Academy of Achievement
- 2003 – Computer Professionals for Social Responsibility Norbert Wiener Award
- 2005 – EFF Pioneer Award
- 2010 – REDF Inno+prise Award
- 2015 – Ford Legacy Award
- 2018 – Elon University Medal for Entrepreneurial Leadership

== See also ==
- Massively distributed collaboration
- List of Jewish American activists
