= Lotus 1-2-3 =

Spreadsheet software

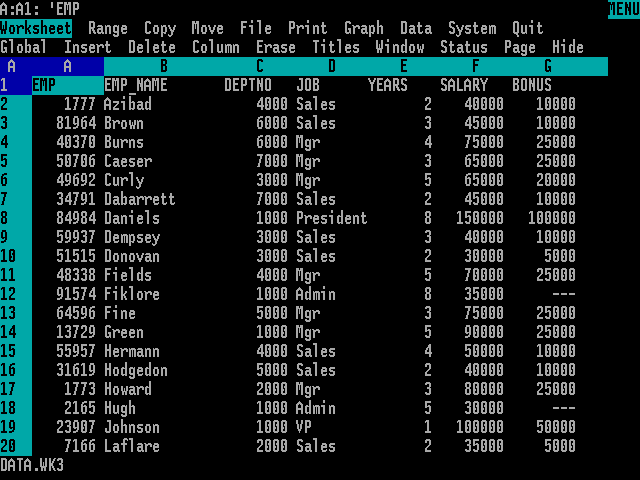
- Lotus 1-2-3 Release 3.0 running on MS-DOS
- Developer: Lotus Development Corporation
- Release: 26 January 1983; 43 years ago
- Final release: 9.8.2 / 2002; 24 years ago
- Written in: x86 assembly language, C
- Operating system: DOS, Windows, OS/2, classic Mac OS, MVS, VM/CMS, OpenVMS, PC-98, Unix, Linux
- Type: Spreadsheet
- License: Proprietary

Lotus 1-2-3 is a discontinued spreadsheet program from Lotus Development Corporation (later part of IBM). It was the first killer application of the IBM PC, was hugely popular in the 1980s, and significantly contributed to the success of IBM PC-compatibles in the business market.

The first spreadsheet program, VisiCalc, had helped launch the Apple II as one of the earliest personal computers in business use. With IBM's entry into the market, VisiCalc was slow to respond, and when they did, they launched what was essentially a straight port of their existing system despite the greatly expanded hardware capabilities. Lotus's solution was marketed as a three-in-one integrated solution: it handled spreadsheet calculations, database functionality, and graphical charts, hence the name "1-2-3", though how much database capability the product actually had was debatable, given the sparse memory left over after launching 1–2–3. It quickly overtook VisiCalc, as well as Multiplan and SuperCalc, the two VisiCalc competitors.

Lotus 1-2-3 was the state-of-the-art spreadsheet and the standard throughout the 1980s and into the early 1990s, part of an unofficial set of three stand-alone office automation products that included dBase and WordPerfect, to build a complete business platform. Lotus Development had their own word processor named Lotus Manuscript, which was to some extent acclaimed in academia, but did not catch the interest of the business, nor the consumer market. With the acceptance of Windows 3.0 in 1990, the market for desktop software grew even more. None of the major spreadsheet developers had seriously considered the graphical user interface (GUI) to supplement their DOS offerings, and so they responded slowly to Microsoft's own GUI-based products Excel and Word. Lotus was surpassed by Microsoft in the early 1990s, and never recovered. IBM purchased Lotus in 1995, and continued to sell Lotus offerings, only officially ending sales in 2013.

== History ==
=== VisiCalc ===
VisiCalc was launched in 1979 on the Apple II and immediately became a bestseller. In contrast to earlier programs, VisiCalc allowed for the easy construction of free-form calculation systems for practically any purpose, limited primarily by the memory and speed of the computer. The application was so compelling that many purchased Apple II computers just to run the program. VisiCalc's runaway success on the Apple led to direct bug-compatible ports to other platforms, including Atari 8-bit computers and the Commodore PET. This included the IBM PC when it launched in 1981, and on this platform it quickly became another bestseller, with an estimated 300,000 sales in the first six months on the market.

There were well-known problems with VisiCalc, and several competitors appeared to address some of these issues. One early example was 1980's SuperCalc, which solved the problem of circular references, while a slightly later example was Microsoft Multiplan from 1981, which offered larger sheets and other improvements. However, VisiCalc continued to outsell these and all other competitors.

=== Beginnings ===
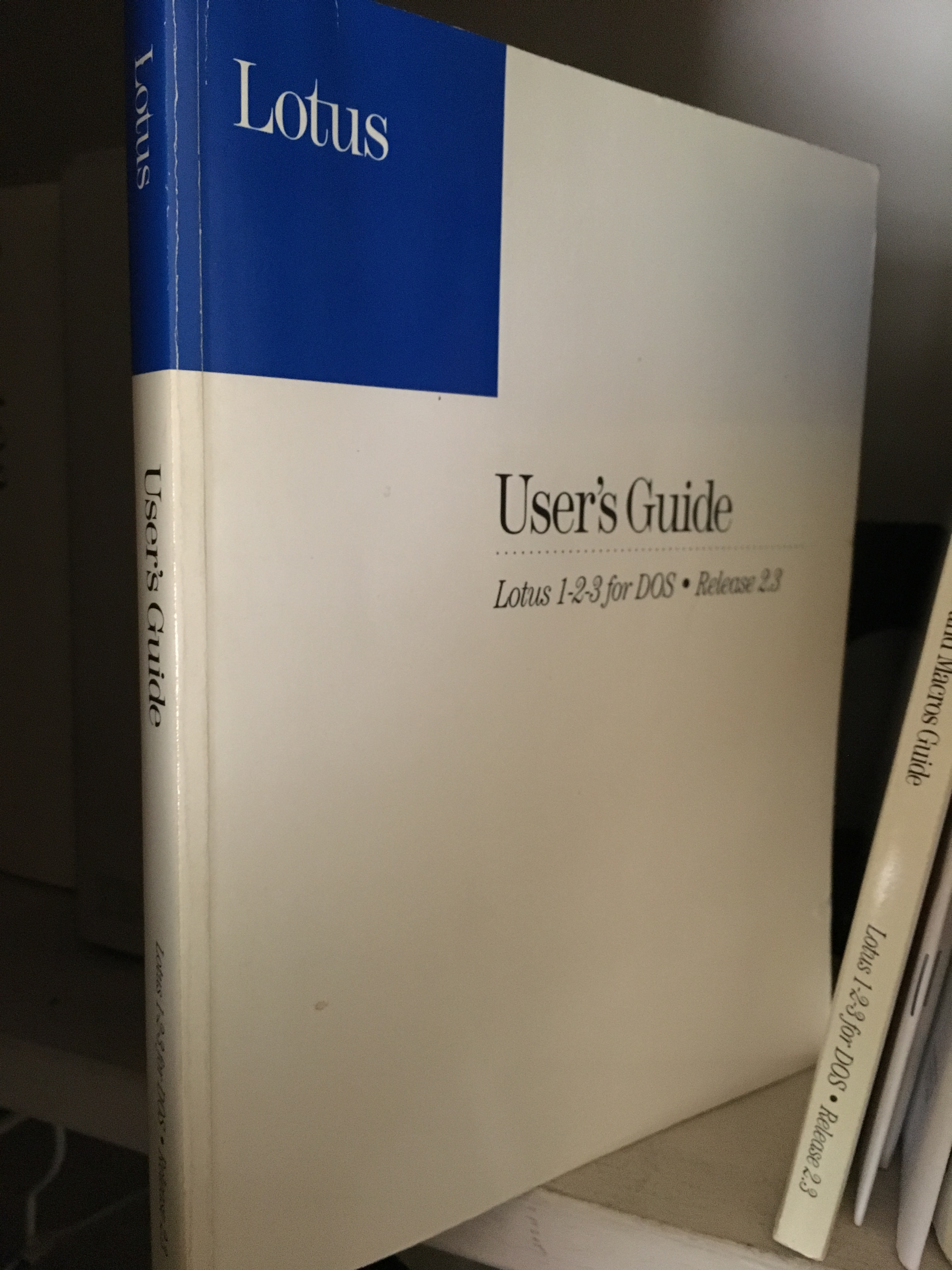
Lotus 1-2-3 Release 2.3 for DOS User's Guide; the Functions and Macros Guide is next to it.

The Lotus Development Corporation was founded by Mitchell Kapor, a friend of the developers of VisiCalc who had written software for it. 1-2-3 was originally written by Jonathan Sachs, who had written two spreadsheet programs while working at Concentric Data Systems, Inc.

"1-2-3" symbolizes the software's three modules: spreadsheet, business graphics and database (replacing the originally planned word processor). While Kapor had some programming experience, he felt that his design skills were superior, and he was primarily a marketing guru. His ability to develop his product to appeal to non-technical users was one secret to its rapid success. Unlike many technologists, Kapor relied on focus-group feedback to make his user instructions more user-friendly. For example, in response to the instructions that read "Remove the protective cover and insert disc into computer", several focus-group participants tried to tear the stiff plastic envelope from the disc carrier. Kapor's recognition that highly technical instructions needed to be translated to everyday English was a strong reason for the product's popularity.

Lotus spent $1 million for advertising in January and February 1983 in The Wall Street Journal, Business Week, Time, Newsweek and computer magazines. Lotus 1-2-3 was released on 26 January 1983 and sold 175,000 copies in its first year, outselling VisiCalc so much that by early 1984 observers expected the latter product to disappear that year. Unlike Microsoft Multiplan, 1-2-3 stayed very close to the model of VisiCalc, including the "A1" letter and number cell notation and slash-menu structure. It was cleanly programmed, relatively bug-free, performant (as it was programmed in x86 assembly language) and wrote directly to video memory rather than using the slow DOS or BIOS text-output functions.

Among other novelties that Lotus introduced was a graph maker that could display several forms of graphs (including pie charts, bar graphics and line charts) but required a graphics card. At this early stage, the only video boards available for the PC were IBM's Color Graphics Adapter and Monochrome Display and Printer Adapter, the latter not supporting any graphics. However, because the two video boards used different RAM and port addresses, both could be installed in the same machine, so Lotus took advantage of this by supporting a "split" screen mode whereby the user could display the worksheet portion of 1-2-3 on the sharper monochrome video and the graphics on the CGA display.

The initial release of 1-2-3 supported only three video setups: CGA, MDA (for which the graph maker was unavailable) or dual-monitor mode. However, a few months later, support was added for Hercules Computer Technology's Hercules Graphics Adapter, which was a clone of the MDA that allowed bitmap mode. The ability to have high-resolution text and graphics capabilities (at the expense of color) proved extremely popular and Lotus 1-2-3 is credited with popularizing the Hercules graphics card.

Subsequent releases of Lotus 1-2-3 supported more video standards, including EGA, AT&T/Olivetti and VGA. Significantly, support for the PCjr/Tandy modes was never added, and users of those machines were limited to CGA graphics.

The early versions of 1-2-3 also included a disk copy protection. While 1-2-3 was hard-disk installable, it required insertion of the original floppy disk when starting the application. This protection scheme was easily cracked and posed a minor inconvenience for home users, but it proved to be a serious nuisance in an office setting. Lotus discontinued the copy protection with the 3.0 release. However, it was necessary to initialize the system disk with the user's name and company name in order to customize the copy of the program. Release 2.2 and higher had this requirement. This was an irreversible process unless an exact copy of the original disk had been made, posing challenges for the transfer of program ownership.

The reliance on the specific hardware of the IBM PC led to 1-2-3 being utilized as one of the two stress-test applications, along with Microsoft Flight Simulator, for true 100% compatibility when PC clones appeared in the early 1980s. 1-2-3 required two disk drives and at least 192K of memory, which made it incompatible with the IBM PCjr; Lotus produced a version for the PCjr that was on two cartridges but otherwise identical.

By early 1984, up to 23,000 copies of 1-2-3 were sold monthly. Despite Lotus including high-quality tutorial software, two dozen companies produced books, videocassettes, and other training tools for the spreadsheet. 1-2-3 was a killer app for the IBM PC and compatibles, while severely reducing sales of computers that could not run it. "They're looking for 1-2-3. Boy, are they looking for 1-2-3!" InfoWorld wrote. Noting that computer purchasers did not want PC compatibility as much as compatibility with certain PC software, the magazine suggested "let's tell it like it is. Let's not say 'PC compatible,' or even 'MS-DOS compatible.' Instead, let's say '1-2-3 compatible.'" PC clones' advertising did often prominently state that they were compatible with 1-2-3. An Apple II software company promised that its spreadsheet had "the power of 1-2-3". Because spreadsheets use large amounts of memory, 1‐2‐3 helped popularize greater RAM capacities in PCs, and especially the advent of expanded memory, which allowed greater than 640k to be accessed.

=== Rivals ===
By 1988 1-2-3 had dominated the spreadsheet market for five years. Lotus had sold 3.5 million copies, and up to eight million people used the software. Competitors emerged, notably Microsoft's Excel and Borland's Quattro Pro.

The first 1-2-3 imitator was Mosaic Software's "The Twin", written in the fall of 1985 largely in the C programming language, followed by VP-Planner, which was backed by Adam Osborne. These were able to not only read 1-2-3 files, but also execute many or most macro programs by incorporating the same command structure. Copyright law had first been understood to only cover the source code of a program. After the success of lawsuits which claimed that the very "look and feel" of a program were covered, Lotus sought to ban any program which had a compatible command and menu structure. Program commands had not been considered to be covered before, but the commands of 1-2-3 were embedded in the words of the menu displayed on the screen. 1-2-3 won its three-year long court battle against Paperback Software International and Mosaic Software Inc. in 1990. However, when it sued Borland over Quattro Pro in Lotus v. Borland, a six-year battle that ended at the Supreme Court in 1996, the final ruling appeared to support narrowing the applicability of copyright law to software; this is because the lower court's decision that it was not a copyright violation to merely have a compatible command menu or language was upheld, but only via stalemate. In 1995, the First Circuit found that command menus are an uncopyrightable "method of operation" under section 102(b) of the Copyright Act. The 1-2-3 menu structure (example, slash File Erase) was itself an advanced version of single letter menus introduced in VisiCalc. When the case came before the Supreme Court, the justices would end up deadlocked 4–4. This meant that Borland had emerged victorious, but the extent to which copyright law would be applicable to computer software went unaddressed and undefined.

=== Decline ===
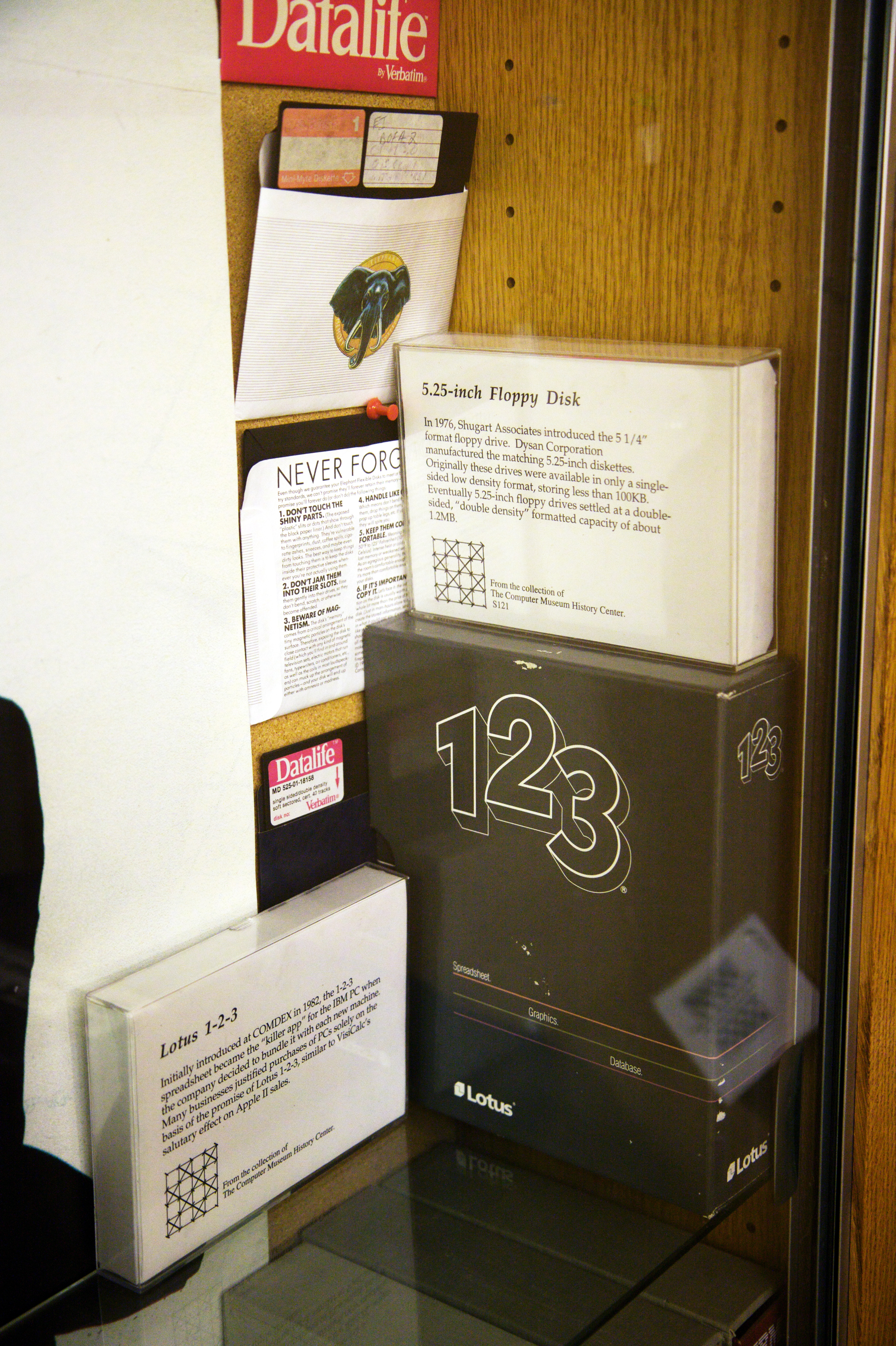
A Lotus 1-2-3 box, as seen in an exhibit at the Computer History Museum in 2008

By the late 1980s 1-2-3 was the world's most widely known and used computer program, and its macro system was the world's most popular application-development language. Of the 15 million Americans in 1987 who used a personal computer in their job, one in four used 1-2-3. A 1990-member survey by the American Institute of Certified Public Accountants found that 62% of spreadsheet users used 1-2-3, with 93% recommending it to others. 1-2-3 was also the most popular database at 25% of respondents, ahead of Ashton-Tate's dBase at 16%, as well as the most popular graphics and staff scheduling tools. By 1991 Lotus 1-2-3 version 2.2 still dominated the spreadsheet market, with sales more than twice that of rivals with more features. Microsoft and Borland's products lacked Lotus's ecosystem of hundreds of third-party add-ins, consultants, trainers, and books. Even Lotus could not persuade most customers or add-on developers to move to 1-2-3 version 3, or 1-2-3/G, because of their need for more hardware, mutual incompatibility, and lack of compelling new features.

Excel debuted on the Macintosh in 1985. It arrived on PCs with the release of Windows 2.x in 1987, but as Windows was not yet popular, it posed no serious threat to Lotus's stranglehold on spreadsheet sales. However, Lotus suffered technical setbacks in this period. Version 3 of Lotus 1-2-3, fully converted from its original macro assembler to the more portable C language, was delayed by more than a year as the totally new 1-2-3 had to be made portable across platforms and fully compatible with existing macro sets and file formats. The inability to fit the larger code size of compiled C into lower-powered machines forced the company to split its spreadsheet offerings, with 1-2-3 release 3 only for higher-end machines, and a new version 2.2, based on the 2.01 assembler code base, available for PCs without extended memory. By the time these versions were released in 1989, Microsoft had eroded much of Lotus's market share. During the early 1990s, Windows grew in popularity, and along with it, Excel, which gradually displaced Lotus from its leading position. A planned total revamp of 1-2-3 for Windows fell apart, and all that the company could manage was a Windows adaptation of their existing spreadsheet with no changes except using a graphical interface. Additionally, several versions of 1-2-3 had different features and slightly different interfaces.

Lotus 1-2-3's intended successor, Lotus Symphony, was Lotus's entry into the anticipated "integrated software" market. It intended to expand the rudimentary all-in-one 1-2-3 into a fully-fledged spreadsheet, graph, database and word processor for DOS, but none of the integrated packages ever really succeeded. Lotus 1-2-3 migrated to the Windows platform, as part of Lotus SmartSuite.

IBM's continued development and marketing of Lotus SmartSuite and OS/2 during the 1990s placed it in direct competition with Microsoft Office and Microsoft Windows, respectively. As a result, Microsoft "punished the IBM PC Company with higher prices, a late license for Windows 95, and the withholding of technical and marketing support". Microsoft did not grant IBM the OEM rights for Windows 95 until 15 minutes prior to the release of Windows 95 on 24 August 1995. Because of this uncertainty, IBM machines were sold without Windows 95, while Compaq, HP, and other companies sold machines with Windows 95 from day one.

On 11 June 2013, IBM announced it would withdraw the Lotus brand: IBM Lotus 1-2-3 Millennium Edition V9.x, IBM Lotus SmartSuite 9.x V9.8.0, and Organizer V6.1.0. IBM stated, "Customers will no longer be able to receive support for these offerings after 30 September 2014. No service extensions will be offered. There will be no replacement programs".

== User features ==
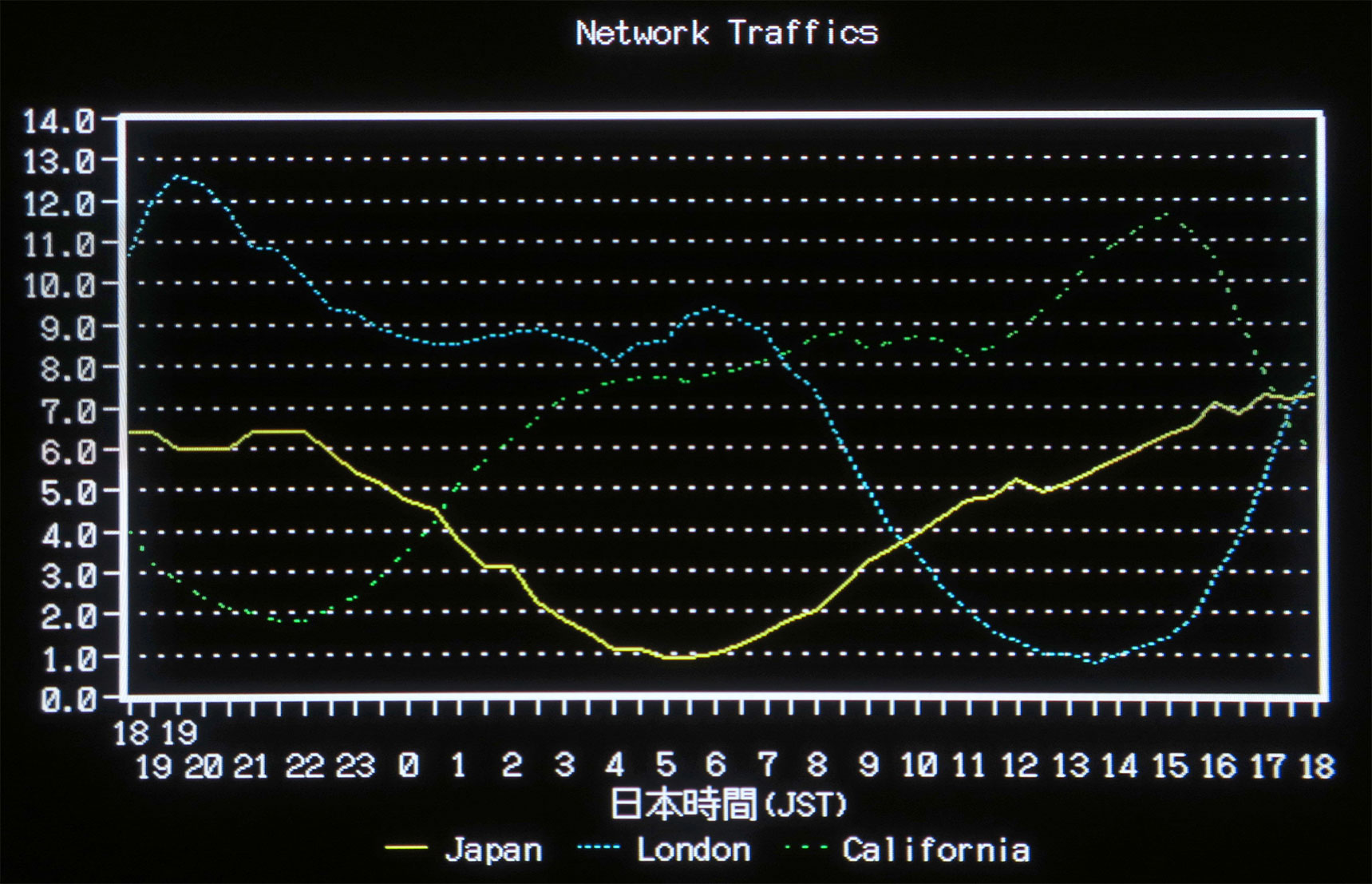
Charting on Lotus 1-2-3 Release 2.2 for DOS

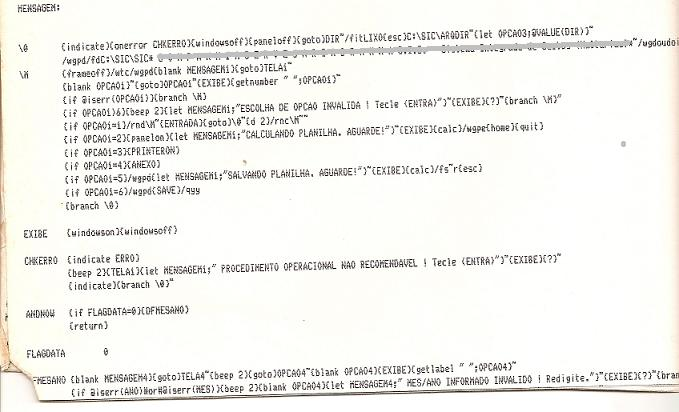
Examples of Lotus 1-2-3 macros

The name "1-2-3" stemmed from the product's integration of three main capabilities: along with its core spreadsheet functionality, 1-2-3 also offered integral charting/graphing and rudimentary database operations.

Data features included sorting data in any defined rectangle, by order of information in one or two columns in the rectangular area. Justifying text in a range into paragraphs allowed it to be used as a primitive word processor.

It had keyboard-driven pop-up menus as well as one-key commands, making it fast to operate. It was also user-friendly, introducing an early instance of context-sensitive help accessed by the F1 key.

Macros in version one and add-ins (introduced in version 2.0) contributed much to 1-2-3's popularity, allowing dozens of outside vendors to sell macro packages and add-ins ranging from dedicated financial worksheets like F9 to full-fledged word processors. In the single-tasking MS-DOS, 1-2-3 was sometimes used as a complete office suite. All major graphics standards were supported; initially CGA and Hercules, and later EGA, AT&T, and VGA. Early versions used the filename extension "WKS". In version 2.0, the extension changed first to "WK1", then "WK2". This later became "WK3" for version 3.0 and "WK4" for version 4.0.

Version 2 introduced macros with syntax and commands similar in complexity to an advanced BASIC interpreter, as well as string variable expressions. Later versions supported multiple worksheets and were written in C. The charting/graphing routines were written in Forth by Jeremy Sagan (son of Carl Sagan) and the printing routines by Paul Funk (founder of Funk Software).

Lotus Impress, later called WYSIWYG, was an add-on to Lotus 1-2-3 produced in the early 1990s. After loading WYSIWYG loads the familiar slash (/) command menu and an additional graphical menu set control all spreadsheet operations, providing access to all 1-2-3's functions, commands, and features.

== PC version history ==
=== DOS ===
==== Real Mode (8088+) ====
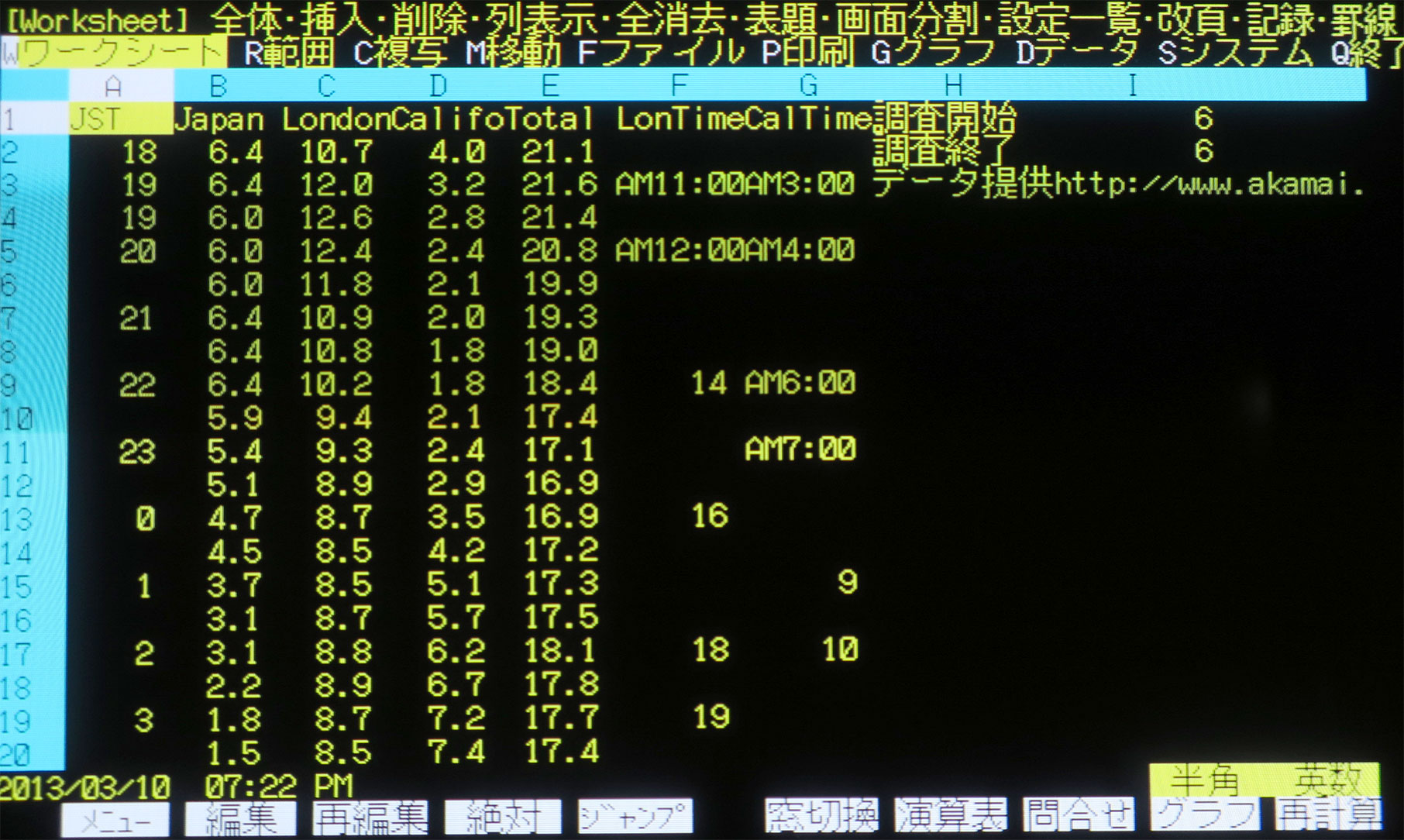
Lotus 1-2-3 R2.2J Japanese version in action

These editions of 1-2-3 for DOS were primarily written in x86 assembly language.

- Release 1 is the first release for DOS-based PCs. Introduced in January 1983.
- Release 1A in April 1983 Officially supports ASCII, unofficially supports the IBM extended character set (but not LICS).
- Release 2 brought add-in support, better memory management, and expanded memory support, supports x87 math coprocessors, and the Lotus International Character Set (LICS). Introduced in September 1985. The Japanese version Lotus 1-2-3 Release 2J for NEC PC-98 computers was released on 1986-09-05.
- Release 2.01 in July 1986. Introduced an option to switch between LICS and the IBM extended character set.
- The Japanese version Lotus 1-2-3 Release 2.1J for NEC PC-98 computers was released in October 1987. A version Lotus 1-2-3 Release 2.1J+ followed in February 1989.
- Release 2.2 brought improved speed, automated macro tools, and presentation-quality graphics. Introduced in 1989. The Japanese version Lotus 1-2-3 Release 2.2J was released in February 1990.
- Release 2.3 brought WYSIWYG editing to the 2.x line. Introduced in 1991. The Japanese version Lotus 1-2-3 Release 2.3J was released in September 1991.
- Release 2.4 added icons and additional tools, and is the last release supporting 2D (only) spreadsheets. Introduced in 1992. The Japanese version Lotus 1-2-3 Release 2.4J was released in September 1993.
- In July 1995, Lotus released Lotus 1-2-3 Release 2.5J for DOS.

==== Protected Mode (80286+) ====
These editions of 1-2-3 for DOS were primarily written in C.

- Release 3 introduced the concept of 3D spreadsheets, utilized extended memory, supported having multiple files open simultaneously, and requires an 80286-based PC or higher. Supports the Lotus Multi-Byte Character Set (LMBCS). Introduced in March 1989. The test was performed with 16 MHz system with the 387SX-16 math coprocessor using the mortgage payment schedule file resulting 33 seconds without math coprocessor and 10 seconds with it.
- Releases 3.1 and 3.1+ added WYSIWYG capabilities, the ability to swap to disk allowing for larger files (up to 64 MB), and can be run as a DOS program under Windows 3.0 and OS/2. Introduced in 1990.
- Release 3.4 added icons, improved performance, and enhanced graph capabilities, making it functionally similar to Release 2.4. Introduced in 1992.
- Lotus 1-2-3 for Home, 1992
- Release 4 was the last release for DOS. More an upgrade to Release 3.4 than in line with Release 4 for Windows, it contains an improved interface and new features, including Version Manager, a spell checker, context-sensitive help, and cell comments. Introduced in May 1994.

=== OS/2 ===
- Lotus 1-2-3/G Release 1. OS/2 text mode application introduced support for the Lotus Multi-Byte Character Set (LMBCS) together with the Release 3.0 for DOS in summer 1989.
- Release 1.1. Introduced in 1991.
- Release 2. Introduced in 1992.
- Release 2.1. Introduced in 1994.

=== Windows ===
==== Win16 (Windows 3.x) ====
- Lotus 1-2-3/W Release 1 was the first release for Windows, requiring Windows 3.0 or higher, is 16-bit, and is functionally equivalent to Release 3.x for DOS. Introduced in 1991. The Japanese version Lotus 1-2-3/Windows R1.0J was released on 1991-11-15.
- The version Lotus 1-2-3/Windows R1.1J was released on 1992–6–2.
- Release 4 is an extensive improvement that added groupware capabilities, improved integration with Lotus Notes, advanced graphics, context-sensitive menus and icons, and in-cell editing. Introduced in June 1993. A Japanese Lotus 1-2-3/Windows Release 4J was released 1993-07-16.
- Release 5 added additional groupware capabilities, chart maps, and improved database access. Last 16-bit version for Windows 3.1x, and was available as part of SmartSuite 3.1, 4, and 4.5. Introduced in mid-1994. The Japanese version Lotus 1-2-3/Windows Release 5J was released on 1994-09-22.

==== Win32 (Windows 9x/NT) ====
- The 97 Edition is the first 32-bit version, requiring Windows 95 or Windows NT 4.0, and has a changed interface and support for LotusScript. Introduced in 1997. The Japanese-language version Lotus 1-2-3 97J was released on 1997-04-11.
- The Japanese-language Lotus 1-2-3 98J was released on 1998-06-05, followed by Lotus 1-2-3 2000J on 1999-07-02, and by Lotus 1-2-3 2001J on 2001-07-27.
Icon of Lotus 1-2-3 version 9.8
- The Millennium Edition (version 9.8) contains new functions, improved Y2K support, Internet support, and better Excel compatibility. This is the last version of 1-2-3 for any platform, and received maintenance releases through Fixpack 2. Introduced in 2002.

== Other operating systems ==
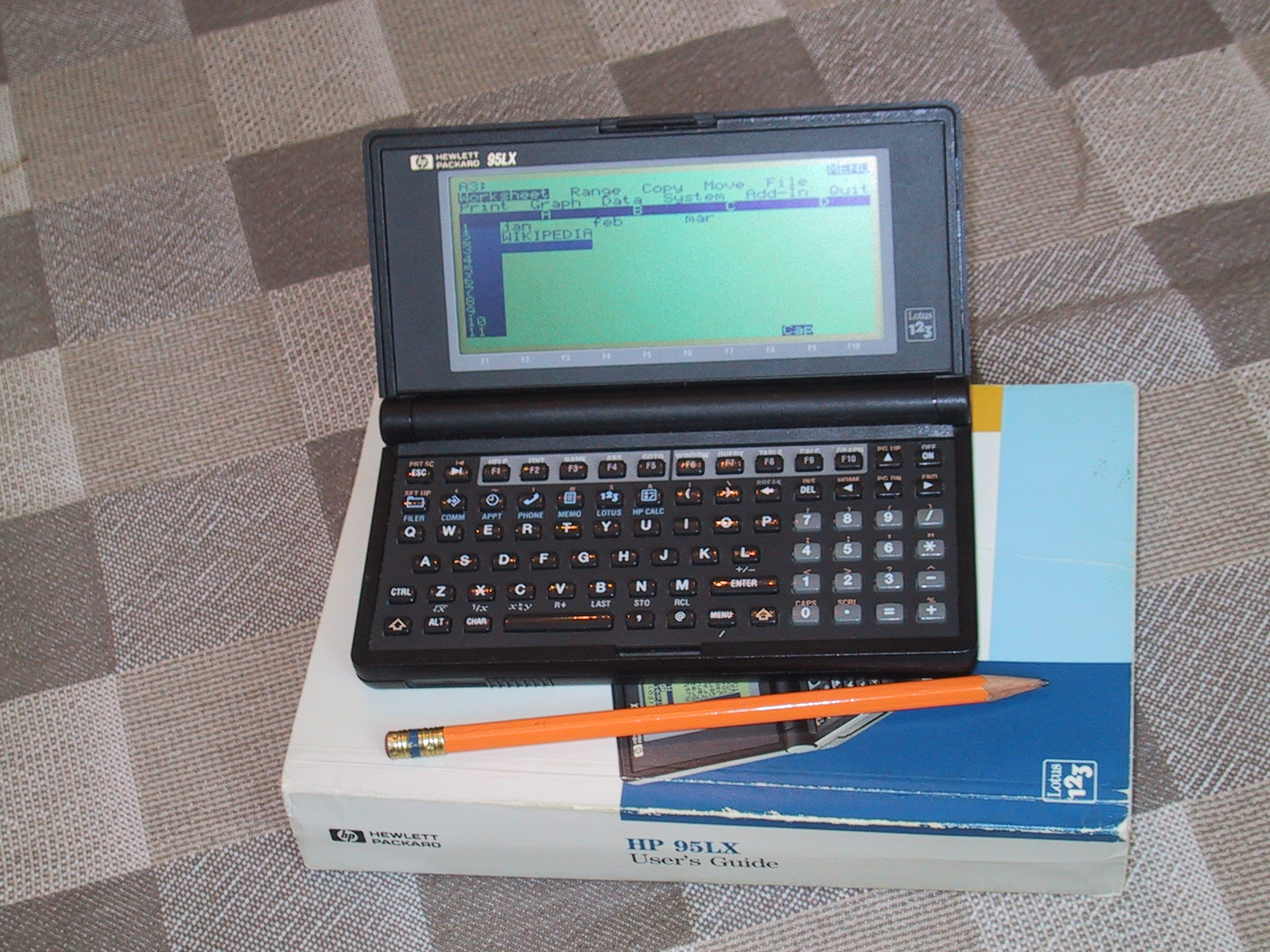
Hewlett-Packard HP 95 LX pocket PC with Lotus 1-2-3 built into ROM

- DeskMate – Introduced in 1989 as Lotus Spreadsheet for DeskMate, not officially called "1-2-3". Supports 1-2-3 version 2.x files, and uses DeskMate's graphical interface. Does not support add-ins, macros, or expanded memory.
- Unix – A single version for Unix System V/386 was released in 1990. It is certified for SCO Xenix 2.3 and SCO Unix 3.2.0, but also expected to work on AT&T's plain System V and on ISC's 386/ix.
- Linux – In 2022, Lotus 1-2-3 for Unix System V/386 was adapted to GNU/Linux by Tavis Ormandy.
- SunOS / Solaris – At least three releases for SPARC-based systems were published. Release 1.1 supports both SunView and the OpenWindows / OPEN LOOK windowing systems. It also features real-time update support. Introduced in 1991. Release 1.2 supports "Classic" in xterm, "Classic" in X Window, OPEN LOOK, and OSF/Motif.
- Based on the Solaris version, other UNIX ports were developed at Lotus's offices in Dublin. The included 1-2-3 HP-UX running on the HP 9000 hardware (series 300/400 and 700), AIX running on RS/6000 workstations, DECstations, the 88000 processor, and more versions of UNIX running on Intel PCs. All support the X11 window system.
- OpenVMS – A character cell terminal version of Lotus 1-2-3 was available on OpenVMS.
- HP MS-DOS palmtop PCs – A joint collaboration between Hewlett-Packard and Lotus, the HP 95LX, HP 100LX, HP 200LX and HP OmniGo 700LX (1991–1994) have ports of Lotus 1-2-3 R2.2 and R2.4 embedded in ROM.
- Apple Macintosh – Lotus's first truly WYSIWYG spreadsheet, taking full advantage of the Mac OS, with two releases: Release 1.0 debuted in 1991 and Release 1.1 in the following year. Lotus 1-2-3 for Macintosh 1.0 received a 4 mice rating (out of 5) in the March 1992 issue of MacUser, praising it for being the first spreadsheet on Macintosh to include in-cell editing instead of using the formula bar found in competing products, as well as other interface refinements. The user interface provides Macintosh users the advanced charting capabilities of the PC version with a Macintosh user interface, while also offering a "classic" keyboard driven user interface familiar to the users of the DOS version, giving it a 4 1/2 mice rating (out of 5).
- In 1987, Lotus announced a mainframe version of Lotus 1–2–3, Lotus 1-2-3/M. 1-2-3/M was designed for use with IBM 3270 terminals and runs under both VM/CMS and MVS operating systems. Lotus 1-2-3/M was jointly developed by IBM and Lotus, and exclusively sold by IBM.

== File formats ==
Lotus 1-2-3 file formats use various filename extensions including 123, wks, wk1, wk2, wk3, wk4, some of these may open in modern desktop office suites like Collabora Online and LibreOffice, these can then be saved into the OpenDocument Format or other file formats.

== Reception ==
After previewing 1-2-3 on the IBM PC in 1982, BYTE called it "modestly revolutionary" for elegantly combining spreadsheet, database, and graphing functions. It praised the application's speed and ease of use, stating that with the built-in help screens and tutorial, "1-2-3 is one of the few pieces of software that can literally be used by anybody. You can buy 1-2-3 and [an IBM PC] and be running the two together the same day". PC Magazine in 1983 called 1-2-3 "a powerful and impressive program ... as a spreadsheet, it's excellent", and attributed its very fast performance to being written in assembly language. Compute! said in 1991 that "you will hardly recognize" release 3.1 for DOS's WYSIWYG appearance. Favorably citing the new interface, 3-D functionality, and ability to use both extended and expanded memory, the magazine said that the software's price 25% higher than that of other spreadsheets "buys features not offered by the competition". While noting that Excel and Quattro Pro would likely respond, Compute! concluded that its new features "entitle Lotus to wear the winner's crown".

== Bugs ==
Lotus 1-2-3 assumes that 1900 is a leap year. This is incorrect, for while 1900 is a year that is divisible by four, years divisible by 100 are not counted as leap years, unless divisible by 400. Microsoft Excel is bug compatible to work with Lotus 1-2-3 spreadsheets.

== See also ==
- As-Easy-As
- Comparison of office suites
- Compose key sequence
- Reverse Polish Notation (RPN in formulas)
- Microsoft Works
