= List of the University of Wisconsin–Oshkosh people =

The following is a list of notable people associated with The University of Wisconsin–Oshkosh, located in the American city of Oshkosh, Wisconsin.

== Notable alumni ==
=== Art ===
- Gregory Euclide (1997), contemporary artist and teacher
- Helen Farnsworth Mears, sculptor
- Kim Robertson (1977), Celtic harp player
- John Altenburgh, musician and composer
- David Gillingham, musician and composer, professor of music theory and composition at Central Michigan University
- Mark Gruenwald, comic book writer, editor, and occasional penciler known for his long association with Marvel Comics

=== Computer science ===
- Brian Paul (1990), creator of the Mesa 3D graphics library, co-founded Tungsten Graphics, which was acquired by VMware in December 2008, where he now works
- Andy Konwinski (2005) is an American computer scientist, businessman, and billionaire. The co-founder of Databricks, a data analytics and artificial intelligence (AI) platform, Perplexity AI, and for his early contributions to Apache Spark. Graduate of University of Wisconsin–Oshkosh, Fox Cities Campus.

=== Business and technology ===
- Daniel Burrus (1971), writer
- Brian Paul (1990), creator of the Mesa 3D graphics library
- Michael Tomczyk (1970), VIC-20 computer pioneer, author, technology expert, Director of the Mack Center for Technological Innovation (2001–2013) at the Wharton School, Vietnam veteran
- Jim VandeHei (1994), co-founder and CEO of Axios, former Washington Post political reporter and co-founder of The Politico
- Craig Culver (1973), co-founder and board chair of Culver's Restaurants

=== Government and politics ===
- Thomas F. Konop, U.S. representative, chairman of the Committee on Expenditures on Public Buildings, Dean of the College of Law at the University of Notre Dame
- Scott L. Fitzgerald (1985), U.S. Representative, Wisconsin state senator, Majority Leader of the Wisconsin Senate
- Roger Roth (2001), president of the Wisconsin Senate, Wisconsin state assembly member
- George de Rue Meiklejohn, United States assistant secretary of war, lieutenant governor of Nebraska, U.S. representative
- Alvin O'Konski (1927), U.S. Representative
- Scott Blader, United States attorney for the Western District of Wisconsin, Wisconsin Prosecutor of the Year in 2015
- Michael K. Reilly, U.S. representative
- John Barnes, Wisconsin Supreme Court justice
- Robyn J. Blader, brigadier general in the Wisconsin Army National Guard
- Mark Block (1977), political strategist, chief of staff and campaign manager for Herman Cain
- Carol A. Buettner, Wisconsin state senator
- Anne Clarke (politician) (1999) London Assembly Member for Barnet & Camden, a school governor at Hampstead School
- Alice Clausing, Wisconsin state senator
- William D. Connor, Wisconsin lt. governor
- Emery Crosby, Wisconsin state assembly member
- George R. Currie, chief justice of the Wisconsin Supreme Court
- George Jonathan Danforth, South Dakota state senator
- Brett Davis (1999), Wisconsin state assembly member, Wisconsin State Medicaid Director
- John P. Dobyns, Wisconsin state assembly member
- Morvin Duel, Wisconsin state senator
- James M. Feigley, U.S. Marine Corps general
- Daniel Fischer, Wisconsin state assembly member
- Jeff Fitzgerald, Wisconsin state assembly member, 78th Speaker of the Wisconsin Assembly
- Richard A. Flintrop, Wisconsin state assembly member
- W. J. Gilboy, Wisconsin state assembly member
- Frank Bateman Keefe, U.S. representative
- Serajul Alam Khan, Bangladeshi political theorist
- Michael G. Kirby, Wisconsin state assembly member
- Kenneth Kunde, Wisconsin state assembly member
- Terri McCormick, Wisconsin state senator
- Balthasar H. Meyer, member of the Interstate Commerce Commission
- Robert E. Minahan, mayor of Green Bay, Wisconsin
- Jeremiah O'Neil (1893), Wisconsin state assembly member and judge
- Ewald J. Schmeichel, Wisconsin state assembly member
- Richard J. Steffens, Wisconsin state assembly member
- Amanda Stuck, Wisconsin state assembly member
- Jack D. Steinhilber, Wisconsin state senator
- William T. Sullivan, Wisconsin state assembly member
- Mary Lou E. Van Dreel, Wisconsin state assembly member
- Jack Voight, Wisconsin state treasurer
- Esther K. Walling, Wisconsin state assembly member
- Merritt F. White, Wisconsin state senator

=== Literature ===
- Dave Truesdale, editor and literary critic, founder of the Tangent Online, an online magazine covers reviews of science fiction and fantasy short fiction as well as providing classic interviews, articles, and editorials. Tangent was the first of its kind in the history of the science fiction field

=== Media ===
- Fahey Flynn, Chicago news anchorman (active 1953–1983), six-time Emmy winner
- Jeff Gerritt, winner of the Pulitzer Prize in Editorial Writing (2019), editor of the Palestine Herald-Press in Palestine, Texas
- Jim VandeHei (1994), the co-founder and CEO of Axios, former Washington Post political reporter and co-founder of The Politico

=== Sports ===
- Marty Below, member of the College Football Hall of Fame
- Doe Boyland, Major League Baseball first baseman
- Pahl Davis, American football player
- Claire Decker, NASCAR driver
- Norm DeBriyn (1963), head baseball coach at the University of Arkansas
- Jim Gantner (attended until 1974), former Milwaukee Brewers second baseman
- Terry Jorgensen, baseball player
- Tim Jorgensen, baseball player
- Jim Magnuson, baseball player
- Michael McPhail, Olympic sports shooter
- Dan Neumeier, baseball player
- Allison Pottinger, curler
- Hal Robl, NFL player
- Eric Schafer, professional MMA fighter
- Eber Simpson, NFL player
- Jack Taschner, baseball relief pitcher
- Gary Varsho (attended until 1982), Major League Baseball outfielder
- Jarrod Washburn (attended until 1995), Major League Baseball pitcher
- Milt Wilson, professional football player

=== Education ===
- Thomas F. Konop, Dean of the College of Law at the University of Notre Dame, U.S. representative
- Terry White, president of the University of Calgary, vice-chancellor of the Brock University
- Michael Tomczyk (1970), VIC-20 computer pioneer, author, technology expert, director of the Mack Center for Technological Innovation (2001–2013) at the Wharton School, Vietnam veteran

== Notable faculty ==
- Kenneth Grieb, professor of international studies, international studies coordinator and faculty adviser for the multiple award-winning UW Oshkosh Model United Nations team; donated $1.9 million to the UW Oshkosh Foundation to establish professorship
- Robert Graham, educator, 12th superintendent of Public Instruction of Wisconsin (1882–1887)
- Lorenzo D. Harvey, educator, superintendent of Public Instruction of Wisconsin (1899–1903), president of the Stout Institute at Menomonie, president of the National Education Association
- Adelaide Hiebel, illustrator and artist
- P. C. Hodgell, fantasy writer, author of the award-winning God Stalker Chronicles, artist and current UW–Oshkosh/University of Minnesota lecturer
- Watson Parker, historian and author specializing in the history of the Black Hills, inducted into the South Dakota Hall of Fame in 2011 for his work, taught at UW–Oshkosh for 21 years.
