= Informix Wingz =

Spreadsheet program (late 1980s / early 1990s)

Wingz
- Original author: Innovative Software
- Developer: Informix
- Initial release: 1988; 38 years ago
- Operating system: Macintosh, Microsoft Windows, OS/2, NeXTSTEP, Unix
- Type: Spreadsheet

Wingz was a spreadsheet program sold by Informix in the late 1980s and early 1990s. Originally developed for the Macintosh, it was later ported to Microsoft Windows, OS/2, NeXTSTEP and several other commercial flavors of Unix. In spite of many positive reviews, including one calling it "clearly the spreadsheet of the future", the market was rapidly entrenching Microsoft Excel. Informix eventually gave up on the desktop market and reverted solely to database sales in the mid-1990s. Claris licensed and sold an extensively cleaned up version as Claris Resolve in 1991, but it was far too late to market to have any effect.

== History ==
Wingz was originally written solely for the Macintosh by Innovative Software (publishers of the SmartWare Suite on the PC) based in Lenexa within Johnson County, Kansas; and was ready for release in late 1988. Informix wanted to enter the desktop software market with products that could link to their back-end databases, and Wingz seemed like a good fit. They purchased the product and released it largely as-is in early 1989. The release was built up by extensive promotion on the part of Informix, including giving away a then-unprecedented array of "convention swag," including high quality Wingz red canvas tradeshow bags. For nearly a year, the buildup was focused around the "Wingz Time Shuttle," an enclosed theatre which traveled MacWorlds in 1988 and 1989. The focal creatives included a video narrated by Leonard Nimoy and automated demos of the product. The video took attendees into "the future of spreadsheet design, past the legacy of failed old products [like Excel]".

== Features ==
The most obvious feature, and the easiest to "checkbox review", was the size of the spreadsheets Wingz could process. Excel's maximum size was 256 columns by 16384 rows, while Wingz could handle spreadsheets up to 32768 in both directions. At the time spreadsheets were still being compared primarily on this feature. A less-obvious feature was that Wingz allowed simple in-cell editing, whereas contemporary versions of Excel forced you to use a separate data-entry bar, a feature also found on Lotus 1-2-3 for Macintosh.

Another clear difference between Wingz and Excel was Wingz' powerful graphing system, once regarded as the most powerful available in any spreadsheet. Wingz' graphing system allowed the resulting graphs to be placed directly in the spreadsheets. At the time Excel offered an anemic variety of 2D graphs, and they could only be displayed in a separate view. Unlike the competitors at the time, Wingz also offered 3D graphs. Additionally Wingz made it easy to make the graphs and modify them, allowing you to see your changes in real-time directly in the spreadsheet where the changes were being made. At the time it was an "obvious" feature, but one that no other program had managed to make work correctly.

A more hidden feature was HyperScript, a macro-programming language deliberately modelled on HyperCard's HyperTalk. HyperScript allowed even new users to write fairly powerful macros, which could include user-interface features such as buttons and dialog boxes. HyperScript 1.0 was missing some rather obvious features. For instance it could not open another spreadsheet, although it could refer to one if the user opened that for it.

A less hidden "feature" was that the program shipped with a number of bugs, which tainted the release. It also lacked a number of mathematical functions that Excel handled internally, and had no direct importer/exporter for Excel files.

Microsoft responded to the release of Wingz, and others such as Ashton-Tate's Full Impact and the Mac version of Lotus 1-2-3 that came out about the same time, by starting an extensive upgrade to Excel. They were soon showing it around claiming it would have all the features of Wingz — in-sheet graphics, large spreadsheets, etc. When it was finally released it was true many of these features were supported, but it was not considered user-friendly.

It was only a short period of time before a Wingz 1.1 release fixed many of these issues, but it was long enough that the product was never able to regain its momentum. It also seemed that Informix never really understood how to market the product, and it is likely 'Not Invented Here' played a major part in the problems as well — the purchase of Wingz and Smartware prompted Roger Sippl, one of the founders of Informix, to leave the company.

Shortly after Sippl left, Phil White, the new CEO of Informix, announced that Informix would no longer be competing in the desktop application space. Joe Erickson, the lead developer of the Smart Spreadsheet, Wingz, Formula One VBX, Formula One ActiveX, Formula One for Java and SpreadsheetGear for .NET, left shortly after that.

Future releases focused on bringing the product to new platforms as their GUI's matured, and adding functionality to HyperScript to allow it to directly interact with databases. Soon it was being marketed primarily as a data access tool, and eventually the name Wingz was dropped and the product became HyperScript Tools. After several years of ignoring it further, it was sold off to Investment Intelligence Systems in the UK. At some unknown point Wingz was bought by a company in San Jose, CA called PDF Solutions which now uses Wingz as a private base for their DataPOWER Semiconductor yield management software packages.

Claris, Apple Computer's onetime software arm, licensed Wingz in the early 1990s after Informix lost interest in the Mac market. They updated it slightly with the addition of the Claris-standard UI (toolbars, color palettes, etc.) and released it as Resolve in 1991. By this time Excel was entrenched, and sales of Resolve were tiny. Claris never released a Resolve-MacWrite-Claris Impact bundle, and so were unable to gain a foothold in the high-end market now dominated by Microsoft Office. They eventually cancelled development in 1993, ending sales in 1994.

Claris did offer an "Office suite", composed of MacWrite Pro, Claris Resolve, and MacDraw Pro. Although this suite didn't include a database (e.g., Filemaker Pro) or a dedicated Desktop Presentations application, although MacDraw Pro did provide some such features, they positioned it to compete against MS Office. The ClarisImpact program was released much later than ClarisOffice and was never included as part of the suite.

== Reception ==
MacUser in June 1989 gave Wingz 1.0 for Macintosh a 5 mice (out of 5) rating. InfoWorld in December 1989 gave Wingz 1.1 a 7.8 (out of 10) score.

As for the Windows version, InfoWorld gave a 6.8 (out of 10) score in July 1990.

== See also ==
- Microsoft Excel – industry standard spreadsheet application
- Numbers (spreadsheet) – Apple Inc.'s spreadsheet application
