= Bobby Kotick =

American businessman and former CEO of Activision Blizzard

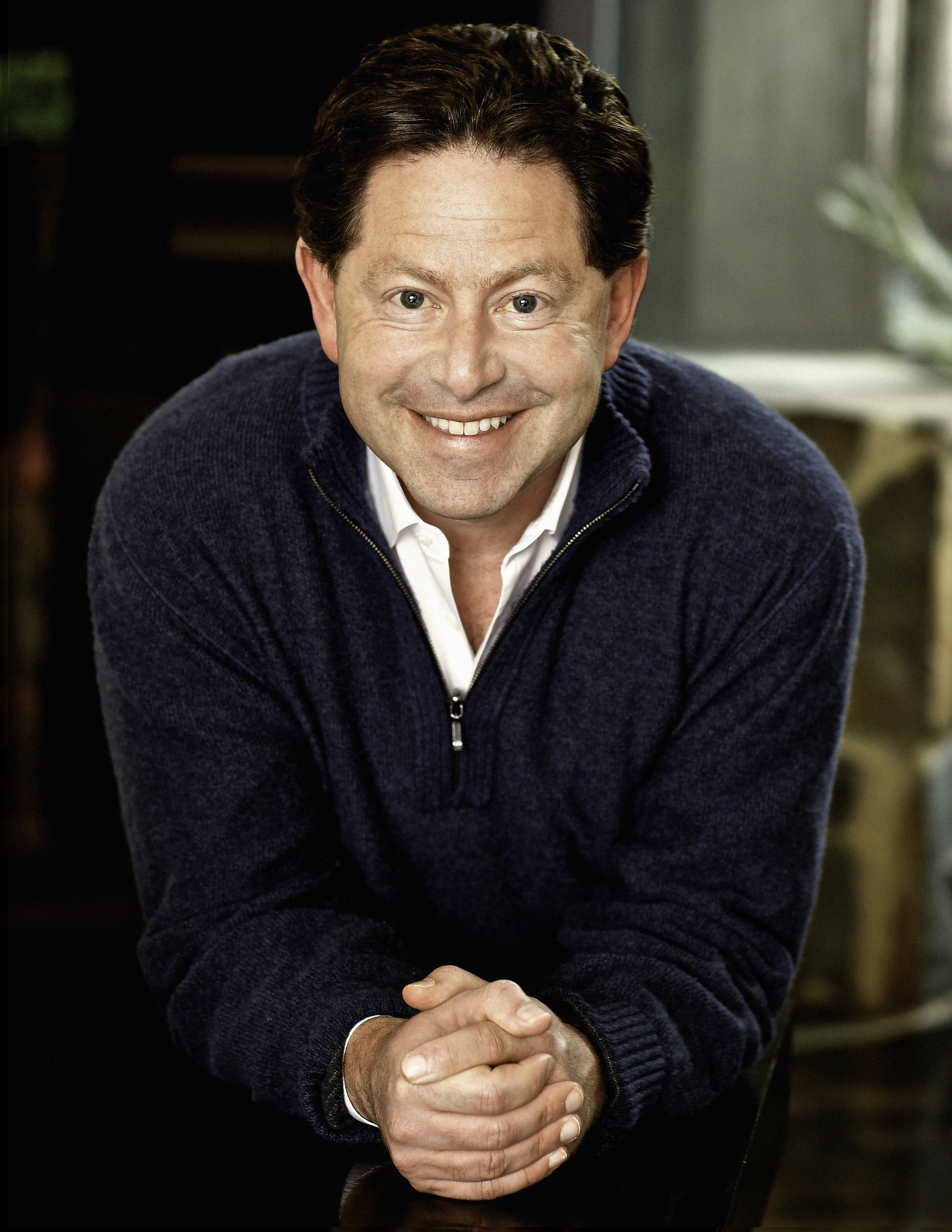
- Kotick in 2012
- Born: 1963 (age 62–63); United States
- Education: University of Michigan (attended)
- Children: 3

Robert A. Kotick (born 1963) is an American businessman who was chief executive officer (CEO) of the video game publisher Activision from 1991 and later Activision Blizzard from its formation in 2008 until 2023. In June 2017, Fortune reported that Kotick had become "the longest-serving head of any publicly traded tech company." He has also been on several boards, including the Coca-Cola Company from 2012 to 2022 and Yahoo from 2003 to 2008. Following the acquisition of Activision Blizzard by Microsoft, Kotick retired from the company in December 2023. In 2022, Forbes estimated his net worth at $870 million.

== Early life and education ==
Robert A. Kotick was born in 1963 in the United States and grew up in Roslyn, New York on Long Island. His interest in business began at an early age. In junior high school, Kotick had his own business cards, and in high school, he ran a business renting out Manhattan clubs on off nights, as well as various other small business ventures like "delivering sandwiches, restringing tennis rackets [and] selling wallets." He studied art history at the University of Michigan in the early 1980s.

== Career ==
=== Early career and Activision purchase ===
While Kotick was still a student in 1982 at the University of Michigan, he started a software company called Arktronics with friend Howard Marks in their dorm room. He and his roommate developed a GUI-based integrated software package called Jane for the Apple II. In 1983, casino magnate Steve Wynn (who Kotick had met when he was 19 at the Cattle Baron's Ball in Dallas, Texas) and his wife Elaine and invested $300,000 in their startup. Steve Jobs met with Kotick and convinced him to drop out of college. Kotick took the advice and left the University of Michigan to focus on building his company. From 1985-1991, Arktonics was involved in a protracted legal dispute over the value of shares in the company that employees were given in lieu of pay at the request of the company's leadership including Kotick, that later turned out to be worth little, after Jane had been made obsolete by improvements to Apple's computers.

In 1987, Kotick tried to acquire Commodore International. He planned to remove the keyboard and disk drive from the Amiga 500 and turn it into a video game system. He was unsuccessful in persuading Commodore's then-Chairman Irving Gould to sell control of the company.

In June 1990, Kotick became CEO of Leisure Concepts, Nintendo's third-party licensing agent. In December 1990, Kotick sold his stake in Leisure Concepts and purchased a 25% stake in the almost-bankrupt Activision, then known as Mediagenic, with business partner Brian Kelly. In 1991, Kotick changed the name back to Activision, restructured the company, and refocused the company on making and marketing video games. Kotick became CEO of Activision in February 1991. An early hit under Kotick's tenure was Return to Zork (1993), which made over $2.3 million dollars in profit for the company with over 600,000 copies sold. Early in on Kotick's career at Activision, having studied rival publishers like Electronic Arts, he emphasised a philosophy of autonomy and freedom for the game development studios under his umbrella, rather than emphasising top-down publisher control, like some rival publishers, which were riven with conflicts between game developers and management. In 1999, Activision had its first major franchise hit with Tony Hawk's Pro Skater. In 2003, Activision began publishing the Call of Duty series of first person shooters, following the defection of the heads of the studio behind the EA published 2002 game Medal of Honor: Allied Assault as a result of Kotick providing them funding. Call of Duty would subsequently go on to become one of Activision's most profitable franchises, along with the Guitar Hero series launched in 2005.

=== Activision Blizzard ===
In November 2006, Kotick entered into discussion with French media conglomerate Vivendi. Through its Vivendi Games subsidiary, it owned Blizzard Entertainment and Sierra Entertainment. Kotick engineered the merger, which created a new company, Activision Blizzard. Shareholders of Activision Blizzard approved Kotick as CEO of the combined company in 2008. Kotick said he aimed to build on Blizzard's successes, including expanding into Asia.

Kotick has used Activision Blizzard's industry position to push partners for changes that he maintains would benefit the gaming community. In July 2009, Kotick threatened to stop making games for the PlayStation 3 platform if Sony did not cut the price of the console. Kotick also urged the British government to reward Activision for continuing to invest in the country's pool of game developers by providing Activision with the same kinds of tax incentives provided by Canada, Singapore, and eastern bloc countries. By 2010, 65% of Activision Blizzard's profit was related to online-playable games. Kotick remarked in 2010 that as leader of Activision Blizzard, he was focusing on profit margins over revenue growth, seeing subscriptions, microtransactions, free to play and digitally distributed games as means to future profit growth.

From 2013 onwards, following the cancellation of Project Titan, Kotick curtailed the autonomy of Blizzard Entertainment within the company, pushing Blizzard to focus on increasing revenue from its franchises, resulting in tension with Blizzard employees including President and CEO Michael Morhaime. Kotick expanded Activision Blizzard's mobile presence in 2016 when it acquired King, the creator of Candy Crush. He also acquired the professional esports organization Major League Gaming. Also in 2016, Kotick announced the creation of Activision Blizzard's professional Overwatch League. In June 2017, Fortune reported that Kotick had become "the longest-serving head of any publicly traded tech company." Under Kotick's leadership, Activision Blizzard was named one of Fortune Magazine's “100 Best Places to Work from 2015 to 2018." In November 2022, the release of Call of Duty: Modern Warfare II broke record sales for the franchise after crossing the $1 billion mark in ten days.

==== Litigation ====
In 2007, a flight attendant filed a lawsuit against Kotick, Andrew Gordon, and Cove Management, a company the two created to manage their privately owned Gulfstream III jet. She claimed that a pilot hired by Cove had sexually harassed her, and that she had been wrongfully terminated after she had reported the incidents to Gordon. Cove denied the allegations and eventually settled the litigation with the flight attendant. Kotick then became involved in litigation with the law firm selected to defend him, Gordon, and Cove Management, in a dispute over legal fees. The court ruled in the firm's favor and awarded it damages.

===== California Department of Fair Employment and Housing lawsuit against Activision Blizzard =====
In July 2021, the California Department of Fair Employment and Housing (DFEH) announced it had filed a lawsuit against Activision Blizzard due to allegations of workplace misconduct and discrimination by several employees. Kotick was not named in the suit. In October 2021, Kotick asked the Activision Blizzard board to cut his salary to the lowest amount allowed by California law, and not to receive any bonuses or be granted any equity amid lawsuits against the company.

In November 2021, an article from The Wall Street Journal reported, based on sources separate from the California lawsuit, that Kotick had been aware of past misconduct allegations, but had not always reported them to Activision's board of directors. These included allegations of rape made by a Sledgehammer Games employee against her supervisor in 2018 that was settled out of court, but that according to the Wall Street Journal, neither the incident or settlement was reported by Kotick to the company board. The Wall Street Journal also alleged that Kotick had intervened to retain the head of one of the company's game studios that had been accused of sexual harassment, despite the fact that Activision’s human-resources department recommended he be fired after a 2019 investigation. The article also asserted that in 2006 Kotick had threatened to kill an assistant on their voicemail. In response to the Wall Street Journal, Activision did not deny that the voicemail incident occurred, stating that Kotick had "quickly apologized ... for the obviously hyperbolic and inappropriate voice mail". The voicemail dispute was settled out of court. Kotick denied the other allegations in the The Wall Street Journal's reporting.

In response to the allegations, Activision's Board itself examined the claims made and retained an outside law firm and other advisors, including Gilbert F. Casellas, the former head of the U.S. Equal Employment Opportunity Commission, to conduct independent reviews. In June 2022, the Board filed its findings with the United States Securities and Exchange Commission and a summary of the independent review's findings in an 8-K filing. The Board's statement expressed confidence that Kotick "appropriately addressed workplace issues brought to his attention" and supported his efforts to lead the company, while over 1,000 Activision-Blizzard employees urged Kotick to resign or to be replaced in light of these allegations.

The California lawsuit was eventually settled in December 2023. The settlement agreement stated that there was no evidence of wrongdoing by the company's board, its executives, or Kotick. As part of that settlement, Activision Blizzard agreed to pay $54 million including set-asides to deal with pay and promotion inequality.

In January 2024, the CRD filed an amendment withdrawing these claims, stating in a publicly-filed settlement agreement: "No court or any independent investigation has substantiated any allegations that: there has been systemic or widespread sexual harassment at Activision Blizzard; ... or that Activision Blizzard's Board of Directors, including its Chief Executive Officer, Robert Kotick, acted improperly with regard to the handling of any instances of workplace misconduct." Following the settlement, several media publications posted corrections and redactions regarding conduct by Activision, its board, and executives, under legal threat from Kotick who has sued news organisations who have connected or continued to connect him with the workplace misconduct allegations. The November 2021 Wall Street Journal story regarding Kotick has not received any corrections or redactions.

=== Microsoft acquisition and retirement ===
In January 2022, Microsoft announced its intent to acquire Activision Blizzard for $68.7 billion, making it the largest video game company acquisition. The acquisition was completed in 2023. Following the completion of the acquisition, Kotick remained with Activision Blizzard to assist with the transition until he retired from the company on December 29, 2023.

In 2022, it was reported that Kotick unsuccessfully attempted to organise a consortium of investors to buy TikTok's US operations.

== Board memberships ==
Kotick is a non-executive director for The Coca-Cola Company and a board member at the Center for Early Education and the Los Angeles County Museum of Art. He previously served as a Yahoo! board member from March 2003 to August 2008.

In 2019, Kotick's total compensation at Activision Blizzard fell to $30.1 million, down from his 2018 package of $31 million in salary, bonus, perks, stock and options. 85% of his 2018 compensation came from stock and options. He was the 21st most highly compensated CEO in the United States that year. He also earned 319 times more than the average Activision Blizzard employee's salary of $97,000 in that year, putting him in 75th place among U.S. CEOs. He was working under a deal signed in November 2016 with Activision Blizzard under which he earned bonuses if Activision Blizzard meets certain financial targets related to mergers and acquisitions. The contract locked him in until 2021.

In February 2019, the non-profit organization As You Sow ranked Kotick 45th in a list of the 100 most over-paid chief executive officers of the United States. A 180% increase in Activision Blizzard's share price since March 2016 triggered an incentive bonus in Kotick's 2016 contract. Kotick was expected to receive a bonus of $200 million, which was reduced to a bonus package of $155 million following criticism.

In 2009, Kotick co-founded the Call of Duty Endowment (CODE), a non-profit benefit corporation. The endowment helps soldiers transition to civilian careers after their military service by funding nonprofit organizations. As of 2026, Kotick retains his position on CODE's board. During the COVID-19 crisis, CODE has advocated for employing veteran medics and hospital corpsman as emergency medical technicians and paramedics.

Following the acquisition of Warner Bros. Discovery by Paramount Skydance into the newly formed Skydance Corporation on October 6, 2026, Kotick was named as a member of its new board of directors.

== Public reputation and controversial statements ==
Forbes described Kotick in 2009 as having an "unmatched eye for spotting hits", and "confident in his ability to understand his customers, whether or not he shared any of their passion for his products." (despite his prominence in the video game industry, Kotick is known to rarely if ever play video games). In contrast to his reputation among investors, where he is lauded for the business performance of Activision and later Activision Blizzard, his public reputation among video game enthusiasts has generally been strongly negative, to the point where some have described Kotick as "the most hated man in videogames." In 2012, The New York Times reported that "The disdain heaped on Mr. Kotick in video game blogs is second only to the admiration for him on Wall Street", with PC Gamer describing Kotick in 2023 as having a reputation among many gamers as being a "cutthroat capitalist" and the "quintessential corporate villain—the go-to name if [gamers] want to talk about soulless profit seeking at the expense of artistry and human wellbeing." During his tenure as head of Activision Blizzard, photos of Kotick modified with devil horns were widely shared on the internet, something which Kotick joked had impacted his dating life.

Some statements Kotick has made about his business strategy have garnered negative media attention and contributed to this reputation. In 2008, he remarked on an investor call that Activision only wanted to publish video games that "have the potential to be exploited every year across every platform with clear sequel potential, that can meet our objectives of over time becoming $100 million plus franchises.", to the exclusion of new titles which cannot guarantee sequels. During the 2009 Deutsche Bank Securities Technology Conference, Kotick stated that "The goal that I had in bringing a lot of the packaged goods folks into Activision about 10 years ago was to take all the fun out of making video games." Following the backlash on this comment, Kotick clarified that his remarks were intended for investors and had been taken out of context.

It was revealed in the aftermath of the Epstein Files release that Kotick and Jeffrey Epstein had conversed with each other via email from 2012-2013 and had at one point planned to meet up, though there is no evidence they ever met in person. Kotick's representative said when asked for comment that "Epstein and Mr. Kotick were not friends or colleagues ever… Mr. Kotick was obviously unaware of the misconduct in which Epstein engaged. Had Mr. Kotick known of Epstein’s heinous and disgusting crimes, he never would have engaged with him in any way."

== Honors and recognition ==
- Ranked 50th in Vanity Fair's 2016 "New Establishment List"
- Ranked 75th on Harvard Business Review's 2016 "Best Performing CEOs in the World"
- Ranked 24th in 2016 and 27th in 2015 on the Adweek list of "Top 100 Leaders in Media"

== Personal life ==
A native of Long Island, New York, Kotick resides in California with his family. Bobby married Nina Spiegel and they have three daughters: Grace, Emily and Audrey. He and his wife divorced in late 2012. In 2014, an ex-girlfriend of Kotick got a temporary restraining order against him after Kotick allegedly harassed her at her home. Kotick dated Sheryl Sandberg from 2016 to 2019. Kotick reportedly used his relationship with Sandberg in an attempt to suppress news coverage of the restraining order. His home in Beverly Hills is filled with Abstract Expressionist art. Kotick has donated to University of Michigan sports.

Kotick identifies as a libertarian and donated to the National Republican Senatorial Committee in 2007 and 2008. He endorsed Democratic candidate Hillary Clinton in the run-up for the 2016 U.S. presidential election.

In 2011, Kotick had a cameo appearance in the film Moneyball as Oakland Athletics co-owner Stephen Schott.
