= Lotus Symphony (MS-DOS) =

1980s MS-DOS software

- Developer: Lotus Development
- Release: 1984; 42 years ago
- Operating system: MS-DOS
- Type: Integrated software
- License: Proprietary

Lotus Symphony was an integrated software package for creating and editing text, spreadsheets, charts and other documents on the MS-DOS operating systems. It was released by Lotus Development as a follow-on to its popular spreadsheet program, Lotus 1-2-3, and was produced from 1984 to 1992. Lotus Jazz on the Apple Macintosh was a sibling product.

IBM revived the name Lotus Symphony in 2007 for a new office suite based on OpenOffice.org, but the two programs are otherwise unrelated.

== History ==
Lotus 1-2-3 had originally been billed as an integrated product with spreadsheet, database and graphing functions (hence the name "1-2-3"). Other products described as "integrated", such as Ashton-Tate's Framework and AppleWorks, from Apple Computer, normally included word processor functionality. Symphony was Lotus' response.

Lotus advertised Symphony on television during the 1984 Summer Olympics.

== Overview ==
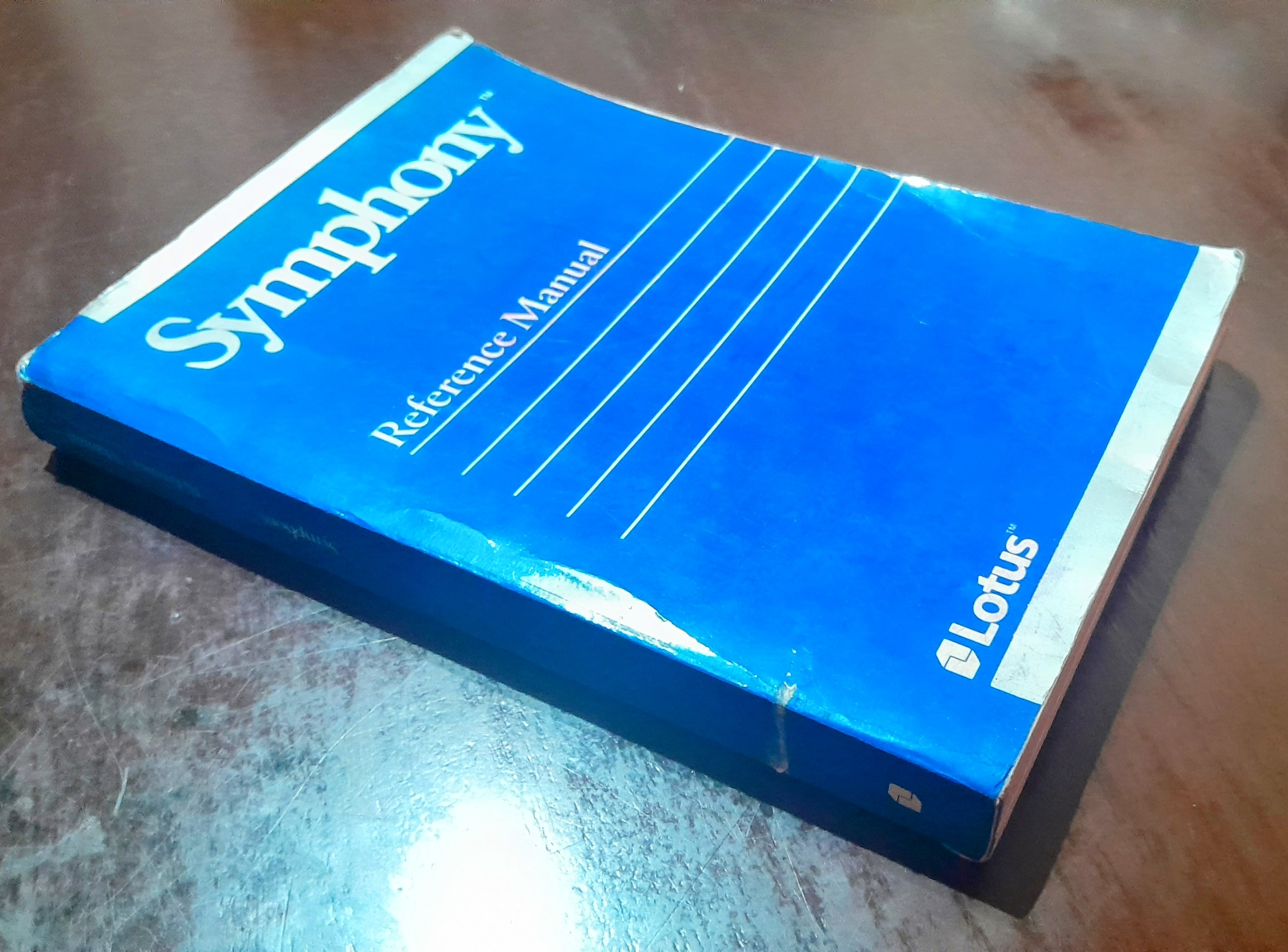
A Lotus Symphony (DOS) Reference Manual book, published in 1984

Symphony for MS-DOS is a program that loads entirely into memory on startup, and can run as an MS-DOS task on versions of Microsoft Windows (3.x/95/98/ME). Using the Command Prompt, and a .pif file, Symphony can also be used on Windows XP and its successors.

Using ALT+F10 the user can alternate among the five "environments" of the program, each a rendering of the same underlying data. The environments are:

- SHEET, a spreadsheet program very similar to 1-2-3
- DOC, a word processor
- GRAPH, a graphical charting program
- FORM, a table-based database management system
- COMM, a communications program

Several "add-in applications" can be "attached" and activated, extending Symphony's capabilities, including a powerful macro manager, a document outliner, a spell-checker, statistics, various communications configurations, and a tutorial, which demonstrates Symphony usage by running macros. The program allows the screen to be split into panes and distinct windows, showing different views of the underlying data simultaneously, each of which can display any of the five environments. The user is then able to see that changes made in one environment are reflected in others simultaneously, perhaps the package's most interesting feature.

All the data that Symphony handles is kept in spreadsheet-like cells. The other environments—word processing, database, communications, graphics—in essence only change the display format and focus of that data (including available menus, special keys, and functionality), which can be saved and retrieved as .WR1 files.

Symphony was designed to work completely in the standard 640k of conventional memory, supplemented by any expanded memory. Similar and competitive packages included SmartWare, Microsoft Works, Context MBA, Framework, Enable and Ability Office.

Symphony's spreadsheet engine was similar to, but not the same as the one used in Lotus 1-2-3, once the most popular of its kind. Additional enhancements included:

- The ability to create unique application looking spreadsheets using customizable macro driven menus and display Windows, the result being menu driven applications that, to the user, resembled little of their original spreadsheet heritage.
- A rearranged worksheet menu, placing COPY as the first menu item, then the other most frequently used items after that.
- Additional @ formula functions building on 1-2-3's spreadsheet only formulas.
- Multiple menu systems, retaining 1-2-3's uniquely identified first-character menu items.
- The addition of the TAB key to anchor ranges, instead of just using the period key.
- The ability to copy "to a location" and end up at that location, instead of at the copy "from location."

Symphony used all 84 of the available keys on the PC's Model F keyboard. In this way, the user could use both hands to select menu functions, navigate menus and spreadsheets, as well as all other Symphony functions, by touch. The introduction of the US IBM PC 104-key Model M keyboard and later ergonomic keyboards diluted this advantage.

Compared to other word processors of the day such as Micropro WordStar 3.3, WordPerfect 4.2, and Microsoft Word 2.0, Symphony's word processing environment was simple, but effective and uncomplicated.

Compared to other database programs of the day—Ashton-Tate's dBase III, MDBS Knowledgeman, Borland Paradox 2.0 and Borland Reflex 1.0—Symphony's FORM environment was not as robust, lacking the analytical abilities of Reflex and the pseudo relational power of dBase III. However, it was integrated directly into the spreadsheet and included the ability to "generate" a FORM from spreadsheet fields. The generator would automatically create the database input form, all the underlying spreadsheet architecture, with range names and query fields, turning a simple spreadsheet into an instant database in seconds. 3.0-Symphony extended earlier enhancements with additional add-ons, most notably:

- WYSIWYG (what-you-see-is-what-you-get) GUI (graphical user interface) and the addition of mouse support
- BASE, the ability to integrate with any dBase IV file, no matter its size.
- ExtraK add-on, extending memory capabilities for spreadsheet larger than 4MB.

Like its predecessor Lotus 1-2-3, Symphony contained a reasonably powerful programming language referred to as its "Symphony Command Language (or SCL) ", which could be saved either within a spreadsheet or separately in "libraries" in the form of macros: lists of menu operations, data, and other macro keywords. (One is "menucall," which allows users to call their own menus, embedded into spreadsheets, which behave just like Symphony's own.) Symphony's "learn" mode for macro recording automated this process, helping the end-user to quickly write macros to duplicate repetitive tasks or to go beyond that, without the need to understand computer programming. One of the most significant features of Symphony was the integration of the various modules using this command language. In its day, it was one of the few programs that would be able to log onto a stock market source, select data using dynamic or pre-assigned criteria, place that data into a spreadsheet, perform calculations, then chart the data and print out the results. All of this could take place unattended on a preset schedule.

== Reception ==
As of 1987 Lotus had sold 400,000 copies of Symphony. A 1990 American Institute of Certified Public Accountants member survey found that 5% of respondents used Symphony as their spreadsheet and for graphics, 4% as their database, and 2% as their word processor.

== See also ==
- Lotus Multi-Byte Character Set (LMBCS)
