= Claris Resolve =

Spreadsheet program

- Original author: Claris
- Developer: Informix WingZ
- Release: June 6, 1991; 35 years ago
- Operating system: System 6 System 7
- Platform: Apple Macintosh
- Type: Spreadsheet

Claris Resolve was a spreadsheet computer program for the Apple Macintosh. It was released by Claris in 1991 and sold until 1994.

In an effort to flesh out their software suite, Claris wanted to introduce a spreadsheet application and decided to buy an existing one in the early 1990s. This was not particularly difficult, as Informix had essentially abandoned the Mac version of WingZ, and Claris was able to purchase the non-exclusive rights to the codebase. After changing the interface to conform to their new "Pro" product line GUI, they released it at the MacWorld Expo Boston on June 6, 1991, as Resolve.

Resolve supports a worksheet size of more than one billion cells and includes 149 built-in functions that allow users to create financial, statistical and mathematical models. Resolve also contains object-oriented, MacDraw-like drawing tools for combining illustrations, clip art, text, charts and numbers in reports. Resolve also included WingZ scripting language, renamed Resolve Script. Resolve also offered 3D charting that Wingz was the first to bring on Macintosh.

Resolve failed to gain significant market share due to Microsoft Excel, which also stopped Lotus 1-2-3 from becoming popular on the Macintosh. This led to disappointing sales, and in 1993, development was stopped. On 31 March 1994, Claris stopped selling Resolve; the program was supported until 31 March 1995. Claris suggested that existing Resolve users upgrade to the spreadsheet module of ClarisWorks.

== Reception ==
Resolve 1.0v3 got 4 1/2 mice (out of 5) in the June 1992 issue of MacUser, praising the familiar interface and the scripting.
