= Magic Desk =

Productivity software for the Commodore 64

Magic Desk I: Type and File
- Main screen of Magic Desk I
- Other names: Magic Desk
- Original authors: John Feagans; Andy Finkel; Michael Tomczyk; Jeff Bruette
- Developer: Commodore Business Machines
- Initial release: November 1983; 42 years ago
- Platform: Commodore 64
- Type: Word processor; File manager
- License: Proprietary software

Magic Desk was a planned series of productivity software by Commodore Business Machines for the Commodore 64. Only the first entry, Type and File, was ever released. It was introduced at the summer edition of the 1983 Consumer Electronics Show in June, slated for an August 31 release. Commodore developed the Magic Desk suite both in response to a perceived lack of productivity software for the Commodore 64 and to the graphical user interface of the Apple Lisa.

Despite its popularity, which brought most customers their first experience with a graphical user interface, Type and File was panned by contemporary computer journalists for its incompleteness and cumbersome interface. Commodore scrapped succeeding entries, in favor of cultivating the built-in productivity software for Commodore's succeeding home computer, the Plus/4.

== Functionality ==
Magic Desk is a graphical user interface featuring a word processor and file system. A disembodied hand portrays the cursor, controlled by joystick. The first screen presents a room with a desk, a file cabinet, a trash can, and a door. The desk holds a phone, a calculator, a spreadsheet, a typewriter, and a Rolodex, while the file cabinet holds a clock that can be set by the user. Pressing the fire button selects the object that is underneath the cursor. On this screen, only the typewriter, trash can, and file cabinet are functional—the rest of the objects do nothing. Additionally, the user can call up a series of help menus by pressing the Commodore key on the keyboard. (Note: Reviewer Mary C. Ware wrote that Magic Desk's help screens were mere regurgitations of the brochure (Ware 1984, p. 20).)

Pressing the typewriter icon leads the user into the word processor, in which the typewriter and trash can can be seen as icons below the text box, along with icons for printing, margin setting, and returning to the main screen (represented by a desk). The text box mimics the appearance of white paper in a typewriter, complete with platen, margin marks and a paper scale. It behaves accordingly, with a tick noise accompanying each key press and a margin bell sounding when the cursor is five columns from the right margin. Additionally, when the cursor approaches the center of the screen, it remains centered with the preceding text moving behind it—moving the page from right to left—as if to simulate a page being moved with the carriage on a real typewriter. When the end of the margin is reached, the user must press the Return key manually to advance to the next line. Text editing is handled line-by-line only—users may delete characters behind the cursor using the Backspace key or overwrite characters at the current position, but no block editing features exist, meaning that paragraphs must be rewritten in the case of adding or removing sentences. Document length is limited to 60 lines. Pressing the printer icon immediately prints the current document if a live printer is connected to the Commodore 64.

To prevent accidental data loss, pressing the trash can icon only once on either the word processor screen or the main menu puts the document into a limbo state represented by a crumpled up piece of paper in the can; it restores the current document into the word processor if the user fails to take action within several seconds. Pressing the icon twice actually discards the current document from the word processor. To save a document to floppy disk, the users must press the desk icon on the word processor to return to the main menu; then they must press the file cabinet icon. This brings the user to the file management screen. Magic Desk performs a check of the drive to see if the disk is inserted and if said disk is initialized; if an uninitialized disk is present, the program prompts the user to press the fire button to initialize the disk while warning them that this results in the disk being formatted, to prevent accidental data erasure. Once the disk is ready, a file cabinet with three drawers is presented to the user. Pressing any drawer brings up ten folders which can be individually labeled; in turn, pressing any folder brings up ten sheets of paper, which can also be labeled. Once the page is labeled (named), pressing the floppy disk icon saves the current document to disk.

== Development ==
Magic Desk was mostly the work of John Feagans, a designer of the PET whom Commodore hired in their research and development office in Moorpark, California. Seminal work on graphical user interfaces by Xerox PARC, as well as a visit by former PARC employee Robert Metcalfe in 1980, sparked Feagans' interest in developing one for the PET. He developed a demonstratory graphical user interface comprising an animated filing cabinet that functioned as a file manager. The rows of cabinets contained folders which in turn contained a list of files that were stored on a diskette holding data. (Note: Michael Tomczyk of Commodore's Pennsylvania headquarters attributed Feagans' inspiration to the Lisa by Apple (Tomczyk 1984, p. 266). However, Feagans recounted nearly three decades later that he had never seen the Lisa at the time (Bagnall 2010, p. 491).)

Commodore closed the Moorpark office in 1982, relocating Feagans to Commodore's executive office in Santa Clara, California, where founder Jack Tramiel worked. A dearth of structured work there afforded Feagans the leisure to adapt his demonstration to the Commodore 64, using BASIC. Mastering how to program joystick control, Feagans added a cursor to the demonstration. Meanwhile, in Pennsylvania, Sigmund Hartmann—head of Commodore's software division—pressed the creation of a large amount of software for the Commodore 64 after promising Tramiel that he would correct for the lack of productivity software. Hartmann tasked Andy Finkel with scouting developers in Santa Clara to ease the resulting crunch time. There, Feagans' demonstration captured Finkel's attention. On Finkel's suggestion that this demonstration be committed to a full product, Hartmann approved what would become Magic Desk, after the winter edition of the 1983 Consumer Electronics Show. Development was to be finished by the next CES in summer 1983.

To avoid a complete rewrite, Feagans used his own special compiler to convert his BASIC to assembly. The code at this point comprised only the file manager, so he teamed with Finkel to develop the word processor. To further speed development, Commodore repurposed the Santa Clara office as a place to centralize select programmers from other Commodore offices. Rich Wiggins and his team from Dallas—responsible for Commodore's Magic Voice speech synthesis module—was one such selection. Tasked with crafting a team of his own for Magic Desk, Feagans picked several members of Wiggins' team for himself, as well as hiring Michael Tomczyk from Commodore's headquarters in West Chester, Pennsylvania, as supervisor. Tomczyk in turn hired digital artist Jeff Bruette. The graphics were initially programmed by Feagans and Finkel who used sprites for the icons. Tomczyk later had Bruette reprogram the graphics. On their flight to Santa Clara, the two hurriedly drafted a mock-up of the software's main desktop screen on graph paper.

Further development of Magic Desk proved laborious and, pressured for time, the team stopped development of Magic Desk beyond the word processor and file manager. In the press, Commodore promised of additional functions added incrementally across multiple cartridges, for release at later dates. Commodore subtitled the first and final release Type and File.

== Reception ==
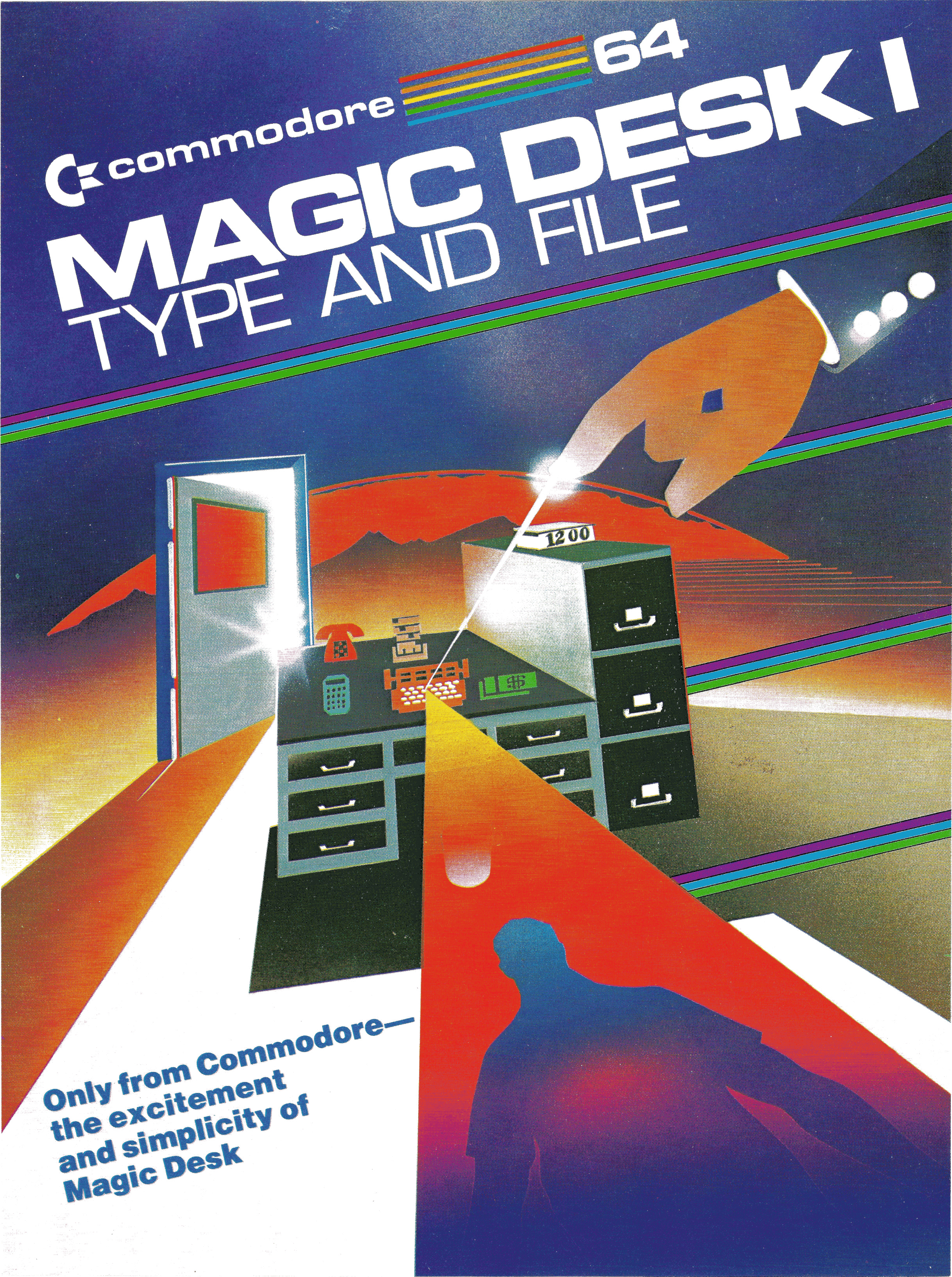
Front page of Commodore's brochure for Magic Desk I

Magic Desk's preview at the summer 1983 CES, although functional, was described by Commodore there as preliminary. They promised a release date of August 31, 1983—which they were unable to fulfill due to cartridge manufacturing delays. Instead, Magic Desk was released in November of that year. Reviewing the preliminary version, George Stewart in Popular Computing expressed cautious optimism, singling out the programmers at Commodore for their attention to detail in simulating a real-life typewriter and filing cabinet. He held reservation with having to create and name new sheets for multiple pages of a document and found the word processor's line limit non-standard.

After its release, many reviewers of Magic Desk raised issue with its word processor. Phillip Robinson in InfoWorld panned the lack of more advanced editing functions—find-and-replacement and block selection-and-movement chief among them. Mary C. Ware in Run wrote that in its quest for mechanical accuracy, the word processor inherited both the good and the bad aspects of typewriters. She considered the page's movement from right to left a refreshing change of pace from standard word processors, as was the margin bell. She found the necessity for manual carriage returns frustrating more than nostalgic, however, and decried the lack of uniform margin and line-spacing adjustment. Charles Brannon in Compute!'s Gazette defined the mechanical simulation of a typewriter as "perhaps a bit too cute" and complained that the word processor provided only a fraction of the versatility of others.

Reviewers also questioned the software's usability and speed. Brannon found the absence of labels below the icons obfuscatory. Robinson praised the graphics as "clear, effective, and smooth" but found the non-functioning icons frustrating—guessing that their only role was in whetting the user's appetite for further Magic Desk titles. Speaking of this, Robinson wrote that its cartridge medium would precipitate wear on the 64's cartridge slot, should further entries in the Magic Desk series revolve around one set of functions at a time, necessitating pulling these cartridges out in order to access different functions. Ware found the cabinet metaphor for a file system intuitive enough for novices but cumbersome for anyone else. Robinson disagreed, writing that the six-page brochure that constituted all documentation provided users with only enough hints to meander through the software without knowing how to file a finished page. Brannon bemoaned the floppy drive's slow speed and erratic operation when writing only one document to disk.

In the end, reviewers agreed that Magic Desk was suitable for novice computer users. Robinson recommended Magic Desk only for first-time computer users familiar with a typewriter. Ware and Brannon went one step further, rating Magic Desk a good value for technophobes. Brannon compared Magic Desk to an IBM Selectric, requiring no instruction to use but obsolete to the intermediate computer user. He felt that Commodore—as well as Microsoft, VisiCorp, and Quarterdeck, who had released GUI-based applications around the same time—underestimated the many man-hours necessary to create a well-crafted graphical user interface, as Apple's Lisa had accomplished.

== Legacy ==
Despite the mixed reviews, the first Magic Desk proved popular in the home, exposing many purchasers to their first graphical user interface. This popularity prompted Commodore to consider subsequent cartridges. In late 1983, while the company had been making progress with designing their TED computer—known from its release as the Plus/4—executives proposed porting Magic Desk from the 64 to the TED. Commodore recommissioned Feagans and Finkel to develop such a port; the former hired four engineers to assist in development of the so-called Magic Desk II. Finkel had to confine the code to 32 KB while adding the functionality promised by the phone, calculator, spreadsheet, and Rolodex icons. Feagans additionally worked even more closely with Wiggins' team to add speech capability. The integral speech synthesis chip of the proposed 364 variant of the TED computer would take advantage of this capability, although the chip's limited vernacular proved difficult to circumvent.

Magic Desk II was previewed at the winter 1984 CES. It was built in to the proposed mid-level variant of the TED computer, the 264. Commodore's exhibition revolved around the 264 and Magic Desk, with Jim Butterfield showing their features to attendees. Despite the exhibition, Commodore executives ended up scrapping the 364, renaming the 264 as the Plus/4, and abandoning Magic Desk II, instead using Tri Micro's 3-Plus-1 productivity software. According to Finkel, accountants at Commodore projected low demand for a Plus/4 with Magic Desk II. The original Magic Desk release, however, did end up propelling the image of the still-popular Commodore 64 from a gaming-only machine to one with the potential for productivity. Berkeley Softworks revisited the notion of a graphical user interface for the Commodore 64 with their GEOS operating system released in 1986. Unlike the original Magic Desk's limited feature set, GEOS supported third-party applications, allowing for seemingly endless capabilities.

A ROM image of a Magic Desk II prototype for the Commodore 64—complete with functional calculator, spreadsheet, and Rolodex address book—surfaced online in August 2021.

== See also ==
- KERNAL, Commodore's name for its operating system kernel for their 8-bit home computers which Feagans pioneered
- Jane, a similar GUI-based productivity suite released for the Commodore 64 among other platforms
- Windows 1.0
- Visi On
- Desq
