= Roger Sippl =

American computer software developer (1955–2026)

Roger J. Sippl (February 22, 1955 – November 6, 2026) was an American businessman in the computer software industry. He was described in 2012 by The Wall Street Journal as a serial entrepreneur. Sippl was the founder and CEO of Informix Corporation, later becoming IBM Informix. Other Sippl accomplishments included being co-founder and chairman of Vantive Corporation, and the CEO and founder of Visigenic: three companies he took public. At the time of his death, he was the CEO of Elastic Intelligence, located in Menlo Park, California.

== Early life and education ==
Roger J. Sippl, the sixth of seven children, grew up in Wausau, Wisconsin. His father Charles J. Sippl Jr. (1924–1991) wrote one of the first computer dictionaries in 1963. Sippl attended Corona del Mar High School in Corona Del Mar, California. For college, he attended UC Irvine where he was pre med for two years, and then transferred to UC Berkeley. There, he studied biochemistry, Immunology and Computer Science.

== Career ==
Sippl was the founder of Informix Corporation, Vantive Corporation, Visigenic, and Elastic Intelligence.

While still a student at UC Berkeley, he obtained a full-time position as a programmer for Bechtel. Moving on to Cromemco, he landed a job as a programmer working for Harry Garland and Roger Melen. He asked permission to leave Cromemco to start his own software company, Relational Database Systems, Inc., in 1980 and Melen licensed Sippl's designs to him as long as Cromemco received the first OEM on the product.

He later said that he was unaware of Edgar Codd's work on relational databases when he began designing Informix's query language—only discovering later Christopher J. Date's analyses of Codd—and stated his amazement that Codd came to similar conclusions without customers. Needing more money, Sippl sold 10% of Relational Database Systems, Inc. to his then future wife for $20,000. He received $184,600 of VC angel funding. Attending a Spring Joint Computer Conference in Atlantic City, he joined a computer manufacturer's tent where he helped to promote their product by using his new database system on their hardware. He sold a copy for $5000. The name Relational Database Systems, Inc. was changed to Informix Corporation.

Informix pioneered relational databases, 4GL application development tools, and OLTP database technology. In 1986, Sippl brought Informix public, with $20 million revenue per year. Informix is now a part of IBM after peaking at a $4,000,000,000 market cap. He was CEO for ten years.

Sippl was the cofounder and chairman of the Vantive Corporation. Vantive was a leader in CRM. When brought public, it was acquired by PeopleSoft/Oracle. Vantive peaked at a $1,000,000,000 market cap.

He also founded Visigenic in 1993, the first application server with the notion of sharing business logic. It was the beginning of three tier architecture and helped pioneer distributed object computing and the concept of the application server based on CORBA. In 1997, Borland acquired Visigenic. After bringing Visigenic public in 1998, Sippl was noted for successfully bringing three Silicon Valley companies public.

Sippl founded Elastic Intelligence in 1996, to improve connection to SaaS-based data. The company's main product is the Connection Cloud, an SQL-based Platform as a Service for SaaS data.

=== Investing ===
Sippl was a founding partner in Sippl MacDonald Ventures. He invested in such companies as Illustra, Broadvision, SupportSoft, and Red Pepper. He was on over twelve boards of for-profit corporations, public and private. The public companies included Informix, Vantive, SupportSoft, and Interwoven, as well as having represented the software industry on the X/OPEN Board of Directors.

== Personal life and death ==
Sippl survived Hodgkin's disease while at Berkeley. He and his wife Liz raised three children, and had an active, outdoorsy life together. Sippl, who also wrote poetry, was an amateur poker player as well. In 2015, he finished second in the $100,000 super high roller at the PCA in the Bahamas, winning more than $1.3 million. His total career tournament earnings from poker tournaments was over $3.8 million.

Sippl died on November 6, 2026, at the age of 71.
