= Lotus Symphony =

Lotus Symphony can refer to:

- IBM Lotus Symphony, an office suite for Windows, Mac and Linux
- Lotus Symphony (DOS), an office suite for DOS from the 1980s
