= Vizastar =

Integrated software package for the Commodore 64

Vizastar was the first integrated software package for the Commodore 64 home computer. At the time of its introduction it was the only package for the C64 with features comparable to Lotus 1-2-3, including spreadsheet, database and graphics components. It had the ability to split or merge files between the database and spreadsheet components and could split the screen into up to nine windows.

To alleviate the C64's somewhat limited memory capacity when running complex software, Vizastar included a ROM cartridge that provided an additional 4K RAM and also served as a form of copy protection. This allowed the program to remain compatible with third-party floppy disk drives for the C64, such as the Indus GT and MSD Super Disk, unlike many copy protected packages. Commodore serial printers were supported, as were RS-232 and Centronics printers with the appropriate interface.

The spreadsheet had a maximum size of 1,000 rows by 64 columns, or 64,000 cells, but because only about 10k of memory was left available after the program was loaded, not all the cells could be used. The additional cells provided flexibility in the dimensions of the spreadsheet. The spreadsheet module had a macro feature that could execute a series of commands at once.

The database had a capacity of 1200 fields, which could each hold 124 characters. In order to keep down the programs memory requirements, it was necessary to export a database to the spreadsheet module in order to sort it.

It was later ported to the Commodore 128.

== Reception ==
Commodore Microcomputers stated that "Vizastar packs so much muscle into the 64 that it is hard to believe you're running it on a 64K machine". The reviewer approved of the software's speed, "excellent documentation", and use of windows to show multiple portions of a document. He concluded, "I ... could find no major weaknesses. It seems to be a 64 application program beyond reproach ... Vizastar is an all-star!" Compute!'s Gazette said "There's nothing quite like Vizastar 128 for the Commodore 128 ... Each application, if available separately, would be a good solid program". The magazine concluded that it was "a gem of a program", and "as close as it comes" to Lotus 1-2-3 for the 128. Info said of Vizastar 128, "Despite minor quirks this is a powerhouse program with few of the compromises normally associated with integrated programs". The magazine added that if the company could combine it with Vizawrite Classic, "it would become the Commodore 128 Appleworks".
