= Vantive (software) =

CRM software company

- Type: Subsidiary
- Founded: 1990
- Fate: Acquired by PeopleSoft
- Successor: Oracle Corporation
- Headquarters: Santa Clara, California, United States
- Key people: Roger Sippl, Steven Goldsworthy, William Davidow
- Products: Vantive System
- Number of employees: 592
- Parent: Oracle Corporation

Vantive Corporation was a company that provided customer relationship management (CRM) solutions. It existed as an independent corporation until its merger with PeopleSoft in 1999. Later PeopleSoft itself was acquired by Oracle Corporation. Vantive as a brand no longer exists, as only the PeopleSoft name and product line are marketed by Oracle.

== History ==
Vantive Corporation was founded in 1990 as ProActive Software by Roger Sippl (also founder of Informix), and Steven Goldsworthy (Informix worker). Its products were developed in collaboration with William Davidow, an investor and author of Total Customer Service.

Its main product was Vantive System, a software suite created to integrate call centers and help desks with field service personnel. One of its clients was Electronic Data Systems, which is now owned by HP.

The acquisition was announced on October 11, 1999. On December 31, 1999, Vantive Corporation merged with PeopleSoft in a stock-for-stock deal worth about $433 million. Vantive System was integrated into PeopleSoft's web-based business applications.

In 2005, Oracle acquired PeopleSoft. By that time, the Vantive brand was fully absorbed within PeopleSoft, and was no longer being promoted.
