= Jane (software) =

GUI-based integrated software package for the Commodore 128 personal computer

Jane is a discontinued GUI-based integrated software package for the Apple II, Commodore 64 and Commodore 128 personal computers. It was developed by Arktronics in 1984, and the Commodore version was published by Commodore in 1985. The same year, it was also published for the French computer Thomson MO5. Like Commodore's earlier Magic Desk software, it used a literal desktop metaphor with the interface consisting of an onscreen graphic of a desktop with icons representing associated business tools: a typewriter represented the word processor component (JaneWrite), a filing cabinet for the database (JaneList), a calculator for the spreadsheet (JaneCalc) and so on. It was designed to be controlled by either a joystick, a mouse or a light pen. Like most of the other examples of integrated software for home computers, Jane's components were criticized for being slow and limited. It was not a success in the marketplace but represented an early example of a graphical interface on an 8-bit computer.

Arktronics was a software development company in Ann Arbor, Michigan, founded by Howard Marks and Bobby Kotick. Jane was originally intended to be a package not only for the Apple and Commodore lines, but also for Atari 8-bit computers and others. This transportability was engineered by a combination of higher level systems written in the C language and machine specific drivers written in the assembly language for each machine (6502 Assembly for the Apple II and Commodore 64). For the C64, DOS manager was written by Howard K. Weiner, and the font manager/windows manager was written by Daniel J. Weiner. The Weiner brothers both went on to attend the University of Michigan Integrated Pre-medical-Medical (Inteflex) Program. Other programmers included Andrew Marcheff and Thomas Naughton.
