= Informix Corporation =

American computer software company

- Industry: Computer software
- Founded: 1980
- Founder: Roger Sippl
- Defunct: 2005
- Fate: Purchased by IBM
- Website: informix.com at the Wayback Machine (archived 2000-06-08)

Informix Corporation, formerly Informix Software, Inc., was a software company located in Menlo Park, California. It was a developer of relational database software for computers using the Unix, Microsoft Windows, and Apple Macintosh operating systems.

== Timeline ==
Wordmark of Ascential Software
- 1980: Relational Database Systems Inc. was created by Roger Sippl.
- 1986: The company changed its name to Informix Corporation and went public, raising $9 million.
- 1989: Phillip E. White took over as chief executive.
- 1996: Informix acquired Illustra Information Technologies, an object/relational database company. Universal Web Architecture, which makes use of Illustra and Online Dynamic Server, was announced in November.
- 1997: Informix was rocked by charges of accounting fraud and illegal insider trading.
- 1998: Informix acquired Red Brick Systems, founded by Ralph Kimball, a data warehouse database company.
- 2000: Informix acquired Ardent, a data management company.
- 2001: Informix sold its database subsidiary, Informix Software, to IBM, and renamed itself Ascential Software.
- 2005: IBM acquired Ascential Software.

== History ==
Informix Software, Inc., was a software company which sold database products, desktop software and development tools, and information integration products from 1980 until 2005, becoming approximately a $1 billion company in the process. The company was active in the Unix, PC, Linux and Macintosh markets, and grew through both organic development and acquisitions. Its best known products were the Informix databases, of which there were several different families. Other well known products included a development environment called 4GL, a spreadsheet called Wingz, a data warehouse oriented database system called Redbrick, and the Ascential information integration family of products.

The Informix brand and database products were acquired by IBM in 2001. Several of the most popular products remain on the market and are continuing to be enhanced by IBM as IBM Informix.

At the time of the acquisition of Informix by IBM, a smaller spin-off company, Ascential Software, was created, which focused on the information integration and ETL markets. Ascential Software was later acquired by IBM as well, in 2005.

=== Founding and early history ===
Founders Roger Sippl and Laura King worked at Cromemco, an early S-100/CP/M company, where they developed a small relational database based on ISAM techniques, as a part of a report-writer software package. Sippl and King left Cromemco to found Relational Database Systems (RDS) in 1980. Their first product, Marathon, was essentially a 16-bit version of their earlier ISAM work, made available first on the C8000 from Onyx Systems.

At RDS, they turned their attention to the emerging relational database (RDBMS) market and released their own product, Informix (INFORMation on unIX), in 1981. It included their own Informer language. It featured the ACE report writer, which is used to extract data from the database and present it to users for easy reading. It also featured the PERFORM screen form tool, which allowed a user to interactively query and edit the data in the database. The final release of this product was version 3.30 in early 1986.

Growth exceeded Sippl's original forecast of $1.35 million in revenue by 1984. Encouraged by important OEMs, Altos Computers and Siemens, his company adopted SQL faster than rival Ingres; in 1985, it introduced a new SQL-based query engine as part of INFORMIX-SQL (or ISQL) version 1.10 (version 1.00 was never released). This product also included SQL variants of ACE and PERFORM. The most significant difference between ISQL and the previous Informix product was the separation of the database access code into an engine process (sqlexec), rather than embedding it directly in the client—thus setting the stage for client-server computing, with the database running on a separate machine from the user's machine. The underlying ISAM-based file storage engine was known as C-ISAM.

Informix benefited from the small size of the Unix market, which reduced competition, and from the lack of a default database, unlike hardware companies' proprietary operating systems. Unix creator AT&T was 10% of revenue, and Unix vendor Altos invested in the company. As Unix and SQL grew in popularity during the mid-1980s, the company's fortunes changed. By 1986 it had become large enough to float a successful IPO, and changed the company name to Informix Software. The products included INFORMIX-SQL version 2.00 and INFORMIX-4GL 1.00, both of which included the database engine as well as development tools (I4GL for programmers, ISQL for non-programmers). A series of releases followed, including a new query engine, initially known as INFORMIX-Turbo. Turbo used the new Random Sequential Access Method (RSAM), which has great multi-user performance benefits compared to C-ISAM.

Informix declined an acquisition offer from Ashton-Tate in the late 1980s. With the release of the version 4.00 products in 1989, Turbo was renamed INFORMIX-OnLine, in part because it permitted coherent database backups while the server was online and users were modifying the data. The original server based on C-ISAM was separated from the tools (ISQL and I4GL) and named INFORMIX-SE (Standard Engine). Version 5.00 of Informix OnLine was released at the very end of 1990, and included full distributed transaction support with two-phase commit and stored procedures. Version 5.01 was released with support for triggers too.

=== Innovative Software acquisition ===
In 1988, Informix purchased Innovative Software, makers of a DOS and Unix-based office system called SmartWare and WingZ, a spreadsheet program for the Apple Macintosh.

WingZ provided a graphical user interface, supported larger, 32768x32768 dimension spreadsheets, and offered programming in a HyperCard-like language known as HyperScript. The original release proved successful, becoming the second most popular spreadsheet software behind Microsoft Excel. In 1990, WingZ ports started appearing for a number of other platforms, mostly Unix variants. During this period, many financial institutions began investing in Unix workstations as a route to increasing the desktop "grunt" required to run large financial models. For a brief period, Wingz was successfully marketed into this niche. However, it suffered from a lack of development and marketing resources. By the early 1990s WingZ had become uncompetitive, and Informix eventually sold it in 1995. Sippl later attributed the acquisition to fear that Informix needed to differentiate itself from the far larger Oracle, and that owning an office suite would further his vision of a searchable, database-based file system. Informix also sold a license to Claris, who combined it with an updated GUI into Claris Resolve.

=== Dynamic Scalable Architecture ===
With its failure in office automation products, Informix refocused on the growing database server market. In 1994, as part of a collaboration with Sequent Computer Systems, Informix released its version 6.00 database server, which featured its new Dynamic Scalable Architecture (DSA).

DSA involved a major rework of the core engine of the product, supporting both horizontal parallelism and vertical parallelism, and was based on a multi-threaded core well suited towards the symmetric multiprocessing systems that Sequent pioneered and that major vendors like Sun Microsystems and Hewlett-Packard would eventually follow up on. The two forms of parallelism made the product capable of market-leading levels of scalability, both for OLTP and data warehousing.

Now known as Informix Dynamic Server (after briefly entertaining the name Obsidian and then being named Informix OnLine Dynamic Server), Version 7 hit the market in 1994. Version 7 consistently won performance benchmarks.

Building on the success of Version 7, Informix split its core database development investment into two efforts. One effort, first known as XMP (eXtended Multi-Processing), became the Version 8 product line, also known as XPS (eXtended Parallel Server). This effort focused on enhancements in data warehousing and parallelism in high-end platforms, including shared-nothing platforms such as the IBM RS/6000 SP.

=== Illustra acquisition ===
The second focus, which followed the late 1995 purchase of Illustra, concentrated on object-relational database (O-R) technology. Illustra, written by ex-Postgres team members and led by database pioneer Michael Stonebraker, included various features that allowed it to return fully formed objects directly from the database, a feature that could significantly reduce programming time in many projects. Illustra also included a feature known as DataBlades, that allowed new data types and features to be included in the basic server as options. These included solutions to a number of thorny SQL problems, namely time series, spatial and multimedia data. Informix integrated Illustra's O-R mapping and DataBlades into the 7.x OnLine product, resulting in Informix Universal Server (IUS), or more generally, Version 9.

Both new versions, V8 (XPS) and V9 (IUS), appeared on the market in 1996, making Informix the first of the "big three" database companies (the others being Oracle and Sybase) to offer built-in O-R support. Commentators paid particular attention to the DataBlades, which soon became very popular: dozens appeared within a year, ported to the new architecture after partnerships with Illustra. This left other vendors scrambling, with Oracle introducing a "grafted on" package for time-series support in 1997, and Sybase turning to a third party for an external package which remains an unconvincing solution.

=== Billboards taunting Oracle ===
During the mid-1990s Informix often bought billboards near Oracle Corporation's headquarters in Redwood Shores, California. One, in 1997, read "Dinosaur Crossing", a jab at Oracle's supposed lagging state in the industry. The billboards were part of the era's intense competition between Oracle, Informix, and Sybase.

=== Internal problems ===
By 1995, Informix had 16% of the database market. In December 1996, The Wall Street Journal described it as the top rival to the much larger Oracle. Although Informix took a technological lead in the database software market, product releases began to fall behind schedule by late 1996. Plagued with technical and marketing problems, a new application development product, Informix-NewEra, was soon overshadowed by the emerging Java programming language. Michael Stonebraker had promised that the Illustra technology would be integrated within a year after the late 1995 acquisition, but, as Gartner Group had predicted, the integration required more than 2 years.

Unhappy with the new direction of the company, XPS lead architect Gary Kelley suddenly resigned and joined arch-rival Oracle Corporation in early 1997, taking 11 of his developers with him. Informix ultimately sued Oracle to prevent loss of trade secrets. As part of a formal settlement negotiated between the two companies, the lawsuit was withdrawn and Informix issued a statement retracting their accusations against the former employees. Other details of the settlement were not made public.

=== Misgovernance and executive wrongdoing ===
Corporate misgovernance overshadowed Informix's technical successes. On April 1, 1997, Informix announced that first quarter revenues fell short of expectations by $100 million. CEO Phillip White blamed the shortfall on a loss of focus on the core database business while devoting too many resources to object-relational technology.

Huge operating losses and job cuts followed. Informix re-stated earnings from 1994 through 1996. A significant amount of revenue from the mid-1990s involved software license sales to partners who did not sell through to an end-user customer; this and other irregularities led to overstating revenue by over $200 million. Even after White's departure in July 1997, the company continued to struggle with accounting practices, re-stating earnings again in early 1998.

=== New leaders and renewed success ===
The capabilities of Informix Dynamic Server (IDS) began to strengthen. New leadership began to emerge as well. The September 22, 1998 issue of PC Magazine noted that:

Informix is battling rival Oracle in the object/relational arena by extending its flagship Informix Dynamic Server with a Universal Data Option. After a turbulent year that included a problematic audit, Robert Finnocchio was appointed as the new CEO of the Menlo Park, California company. With 1997 revenues of $662.3 million, Informix has begun to strengthen its position in the database market.

=== Phillip White indicted ===
Phillip White, the former CEO of Informix, had been ousted in 1997. In November 2002, he was indicted by a federal grand jury and charged with eight counts of securities, wire, and mail fraud. In a plea bargain thirteen months later, he pleaded guilty to a single count of filing a false registration statement with the U.S. Securities and Exchange Commission.

In May 2004, the Department of Justice announced that White was sentenced to two months in federal prison for securities fraud, with a fine of $10,000, two years of supervised release, and 300 hours of community service. The announcement noted that the loss to shareholders caused by the violation could not reasonably be estimated under the facts of the case. White's earlier plea agreement had limited prison time to no more than 12 months.

Walter Königseder, the company's vice president in charge of European operations, was also indicted by a federal grand jury. However, he was a citizen and resident of Germany, and the United States was unable to secure his extradition.

=== Informix acquires Ardent Software ===
In March 2000, Informix acquired Ardent Software, a company with a history of mergers and acquisitions. This gave Informix access to the legacy MultiValue database platforms UniVerse and UniData, known collectively as U2 (now Rocket U2), as well as a small set of Extract, Transform and Load (ETL) and other information integration products.

In July 2000, the former CEO of Ardent, Peter Gyenes, became the CEO of Informix, and soon re-organized Informix to make it more attractive as an acquisition target. The major step was separating the database engine technologies from the recently acquired Ardent Software ETL and information integration products.

=== Informix divests: acquisition of the Informix Database business by IBM ===
According to Sippl, IBM had considered acquiring Informix as early as the 1980s. In April 2001, IBM negotiated with Informix to buy the core database business. Prompted by a suggestion from Wal-Mart, one of Informix's largest customers, Janet Perna led IBM's purchase of Informix's database technology, brand, and plans for future development (an internal project codenamed "Arrowhead"), as well as the customer base (over 100,000 customers) associated with these items. IBM's Don Haderle later said that "buying Informix was buying an installed base with a set of well-known VARs that were already lashed up. It was buying that ecosystem". The deal closed on July 1, 2001. Approximately 2,000 Informix employees moved to IBM as part of the deal.

=== Informix renames itself Ascential and moves into ETL business ===
Informix shareholders approved this deal, which delivered $1 billion in cash to the much smaller remaining company, which intended to focus on the high growth ETL and information integration space, dominated at the time by Informatica. The remaining company then renamed itself Ascential Software, and continued to be led by CEO Peter Geyenes and President Peter Fiore.

Ascential Software made use of its large cash holdings from the Informix sale to buy a number of smaller companies with technology. Many were had at bargain prices, as the software industry was caught up in the economic slump following the 9/11/2001 terrorist attacks.

Despite these acquisitions, Ascential was never able to come anywhere near matching the financial performance of Informix prior to the sale, and was eventually forced to perform a 4 for 1 reverse stock split to ensure that the stock was not delisted from NASDAQ for falling below the minimum share price.

=== IBM buys Ascential ===
In May 2005, IBM bought Ascential, reuniting all of Informix's assets under IBM's Information Management Software portfolio. The deal paid Ascential shareholders $1.1 billion, but IBM assumed control of $481 million in cash that Ascential had retained from the Informix sale. Shareholders received $18.50 a share, a 15% premium over the previous close of $15.70. Shareholders who had held on from the Informix era did not fare so well: after accounting for the reverse split, the deal netted them only $4.62 a share, far less than the price before IBM's first acquisition, which had hovered a bit over $7.00 through March 2001. Sippl later noted that "they sold themselves to IBM I think for another billion dollars, which was the same billion that IBM paid them. So essentially whatever business they were in was apparently worthless because they only got the one billion for it".

In November 2005, Steve W. Martin, a longtime Informix employee, published a book detailing the rise and fall of Informix Software and CEO Phil White, titled The Real Story of Informix Software and Phil White: Lessons in Business and Leadership for the Executive Team.

== Product lineup ==
Prior to its purchase, Informix's product lineup included:

- Informix C-ISAM - the latest version of the original Marathon database
- Informix Standard Engine (SE) - offered as a low-end system for embedding into applications
- Informix OnLine (Online 5) - a competent system for managing medium size databases
- Informix Dynamic Server (IDS, V7) - the product from which V9, V10 and V11 directly descended
- Informix Extended Parallel Server (XPS, V8) - a high-end version based on the V7 code base for use on clusters and MPP machines. Focused on data warehouse workloads, but with full OLTP capability
- Informix Universal Server (V9) - a combination of the V7 OnLine engine with the O-R mapping and DataBlade support from Illustra. The basis for V10 and V11
- Informix-4GL - A fourth generation language for application programming
- Red Brick Warehouse - a data warehouse product
- Cloudscape - an RDBMS written entirely in Java that fit into mobile devices on the low-end and J2EE-based architectures on the high end. In 2004, Cloudscape was released by IBM as an open source database to be managed by the Apache Software Foundation, under the name Derby.
- U2 suite (UniVerse and UniData) - MultiValue databases that offer networks, hierarchies, arrays and other data formats difficult to model in SQL

== See also ==
- List of relational database management systems
- Comparison of relational database management systems
