= Janet Perna =

IBM computer scientist

Janet Perna is an American computer scientist known for her work in coordinating IBM's work in the field of databases.

== Education and career ==
Perna grew up in Poughkeepsie, New York. She graduated with a degree in mathematics from SUNY Oneonta in 1970, and started teaching mathematics. In 1974 she moved to California and got a job at IBM as a programmer. She worked first in San Jose, and then moved to IBM's Santa Teresa Laboratory. She later moved to the data management division, and then the information management group. Projects she worked on included preparing the IBM Db2 for public release, and encouraging IBM's 2001 purchase of the database company Informix Corporation. Perna was recognized as an industry leader for her contributions to IBM's data management business. She played a crucial role in expanding IBM's data management into new, lucrative areas and setting industry standards. By 2001, she was the most senior female executive at IBM.

After 31 years at IBM, she retired in 2006.

== Honors and awards ==
During her time at IBM, Janet was inducted into the Women in Technology International Hall of Fame and was recognized by InformationWeek as one of the "Top 10 Women in IT" in the United States.

Perna received an honorary degree from State University of New York at Oneonta in 2012.

In 2018, SUNY Oneota re-named a building the "Janet R. Perna Science Building".

In addition to these honors, Perna has been recognized for her leadership in database management at IBM. She was named one of the "Top 50 Women to Watch" by Women in Technology International and received the "Leadership Award" from Computerworld. Additionally, eWeek listed her in their "Top 100 Most Influential People in IT". Her contributions were pivotal in IBM's acquisition of Informix Corporation, further cementing her legacy in the tech industry.

== Volunteering ==
Perna would later go on to co-found the Perna-Rose Foundation for Hope. As of June 2025, the foundation has donated $2,925,246 to non-profits.
