= Context MBA =

Context MBA was the first integrated software application for personal computers, providing five functions in one program: spreadsheet, database, charting, word processing, and communication software. It was first released in 1981 by Context Management Systems for the Apple III computer, but was later ported to the Hewlett Packard 9000 / 200 series computers running Rocky Mountain BASIC and IBM PC platform as well.

Since the program was written in UCSD Pascal, it was easy to port to different platforms, but did so at the expense of performance, which was critical at the time of its release, given the limited amount of memory, processing power, and disk I/O available on a desktop computer. It was soon overtaken by Lotus 1-2-3, a more limited integrated software package, but one written in assembly language, yielding much better performance.

Context Management sold the software through individual ComputerLand and other retail stores, directly to large customers, and through value-added resellers such as University Computing Company.

== Reception ==
PC Magazine stated in June 1983 that Context MBA "still runs too slowly for a person accustomed to the speed of a microcomputer". It found the spreadsheet the best application of the suite, describing the database as "amazingly slow" and the text editor as "clumsy and confusing". The review concluded that Context MBA "fails in two areas ... UCSD p-System simply does not produce good code", and a confusing, heavily modal user interface.
