= Culver's =

American restaurant chain

Culver Franchising System, LLC

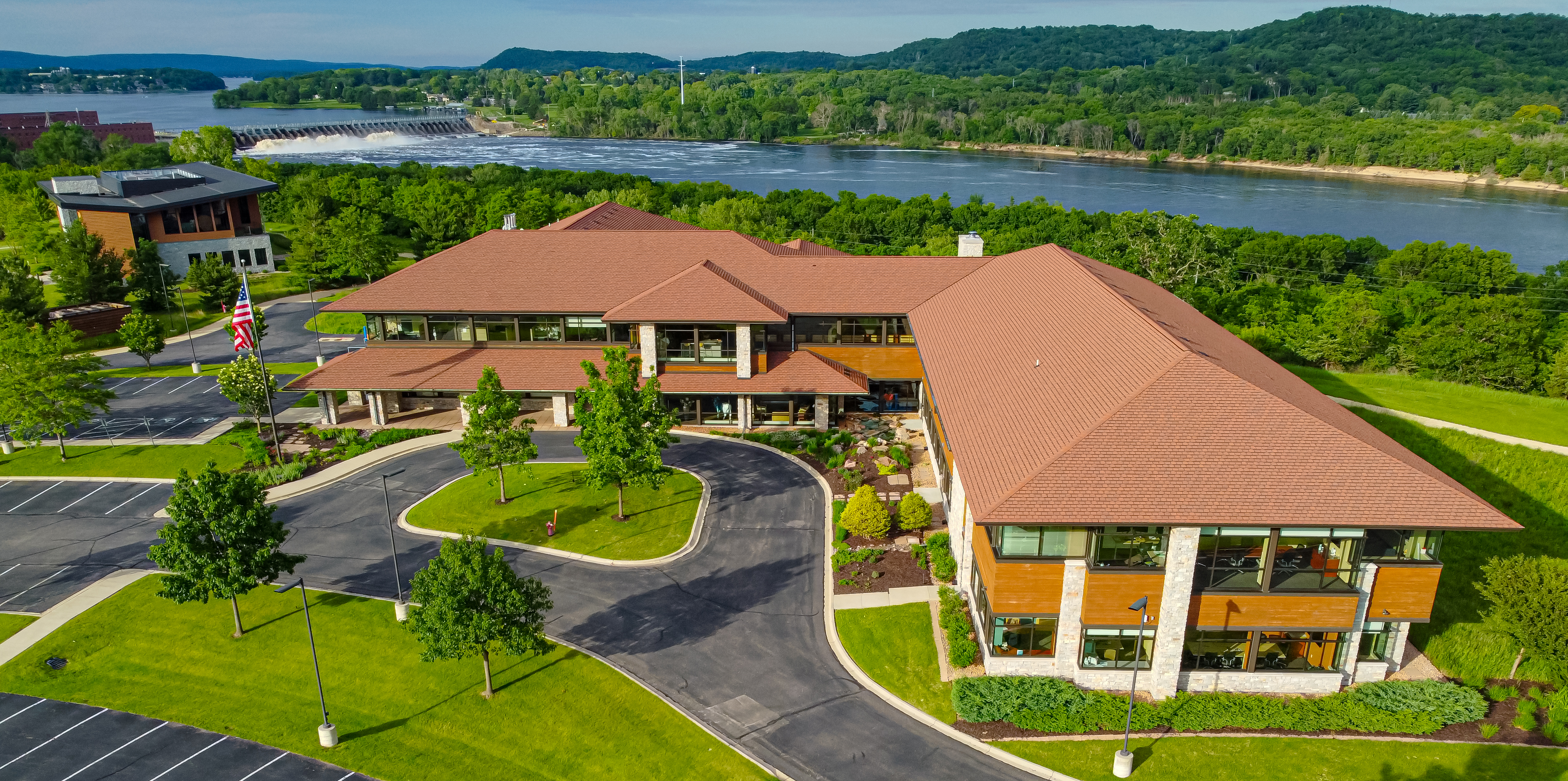
- Headquarters in Prairie du Sac, Wisconsin
- Trade name: Culver's
- Formerly: Culver Enterprises, Inc.
- Type: Private
- Industry: Fast food restaurants Franchising
- Founded: July 18, 1984; 42 years ago in Sauk City, Wisconsin
- Founders: Craig Culver; Lea Culver; George Culver; Ruth Culver
- Headquarters: Prairie du Sac, Wisconsin, United States
- Number of locations: 1,000 (April 2025)
- Area served: 27 U.S. states, mainly in the Midwest
- Key people: Julie Fussner (CEO); Craig Culver (chairman)
- Products: Hamburgers; Frozen custard; Milkshakes; Cheese curds; Chicken sandwiches; Chicken tenders; Fish; French fries; Corn dogs; Soup; Onion rings; Salads; Grilled Cheese
- Revenue: ▲$3.2 billion
- Owner: Culver family
- Website: Official website

Culver Franchising System, LLC, doing business as Culver's, is an American regional fast-casual restaurant chain. The company was founded in 1984 by George, Ruth, Craig, and Lea Culver. The first location opened in Sauk City, Wisconsin, on July 18, 1984, under the name "Culver's Frozen Custard and ButterBurgers". The privately held company is headquartered in Prairie du Sac, Wisconsin. The chain operates primarily in the Midwestern United States, and has a total of 1,000 restaurants in 26 states as of April 2025.

== History ==
Sauk City restaurateurs and husband and wife team George and Ruth Culver started their fast food careers as the owners of an A&W on Phillips Boulevard (U.S. Highway 12) in 1961. In 1968, they purchased a resort-styled restaurant at Devil's Lake called The Farm Kitchen. Their son, Craig Culver, worked for a local McDonald's right out of college in 1973. George, Ruth, their son Craig, and his wife Lea opened the first Culver's Frozen Custard and ButterBurgers in Sauk City, Wisconsin on July 18, 1984. Craig was CEO of Culver's from its inception until mid-2015.

=== Wisconsin ===
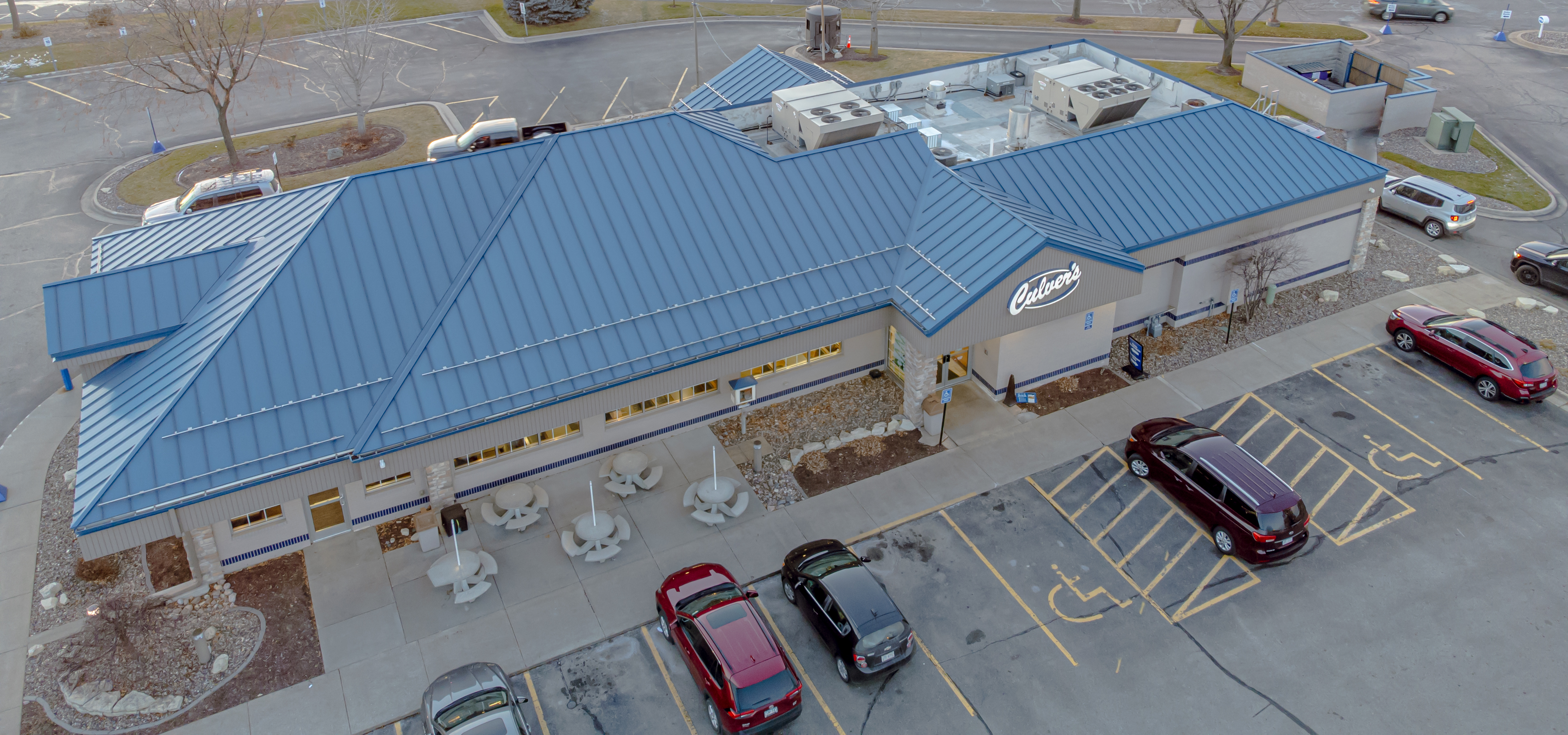
Culver's in Onalaska, Wisconsin, featuring the traditional blue metal roof

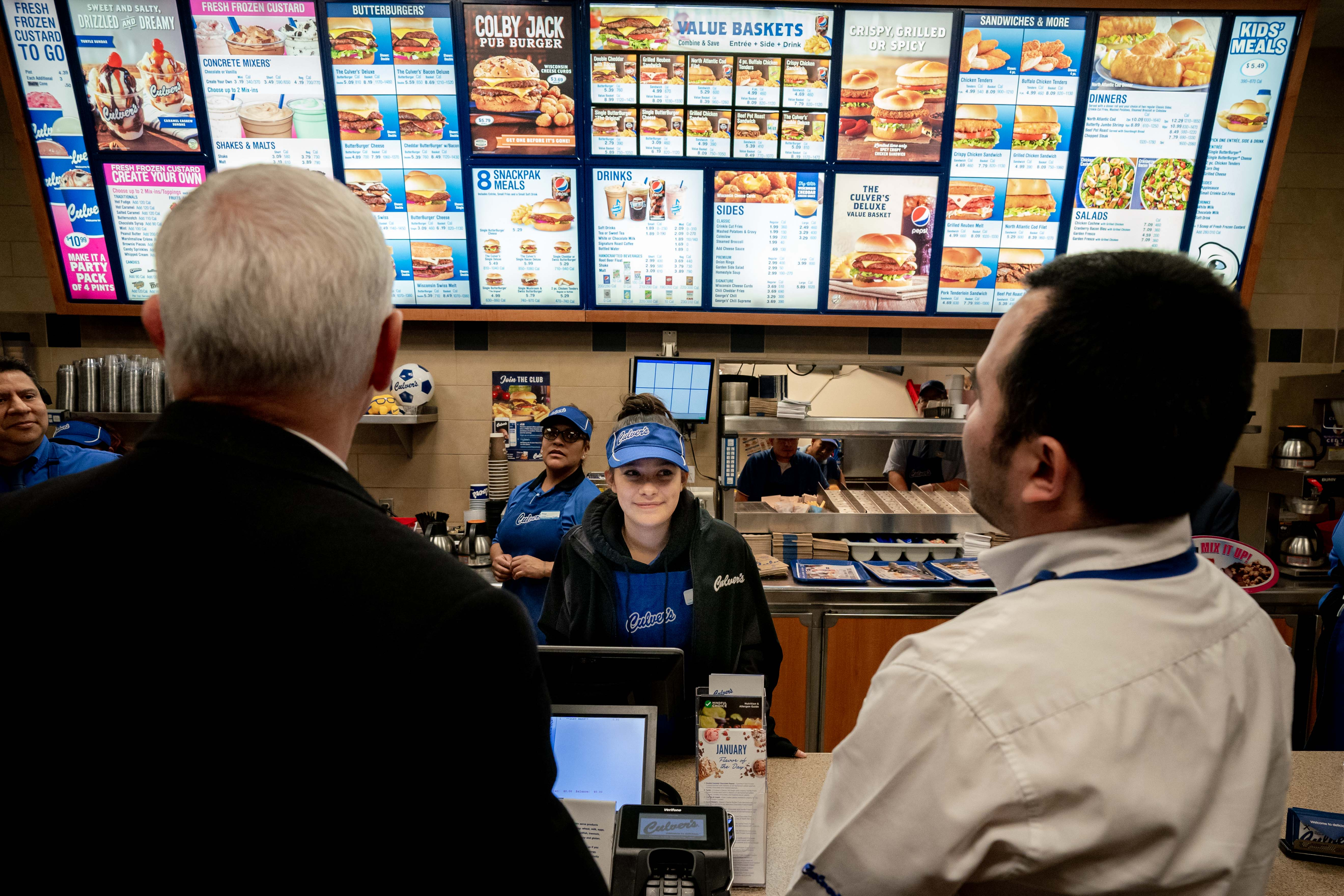
A Culver's counter in Milwaukee (customer on the left is then-Vice President Mike Pence)

The Culver family started franchising the restaurant in 1988. The family agreed, granting the franchisee a loose licensing agreement, charging no fees or royalties. Because the franchisee had invested very little of his own money, it was a simple matter for him to walk away a year later when he decided he no longer wanted to be in the restaurant business.

As a result of this experience, the Culver family established a set of standard franchising procedures that form the basis for those currently used by Culver Franchising System, Inc. Three years later, they tried again in Baraboo, and business quickly doubled. Soon after, the increased recognition that the second store earned this small-town chain prompted expansion into the Middleton, Madison and Milwaukee areas.

=== Midwest ===
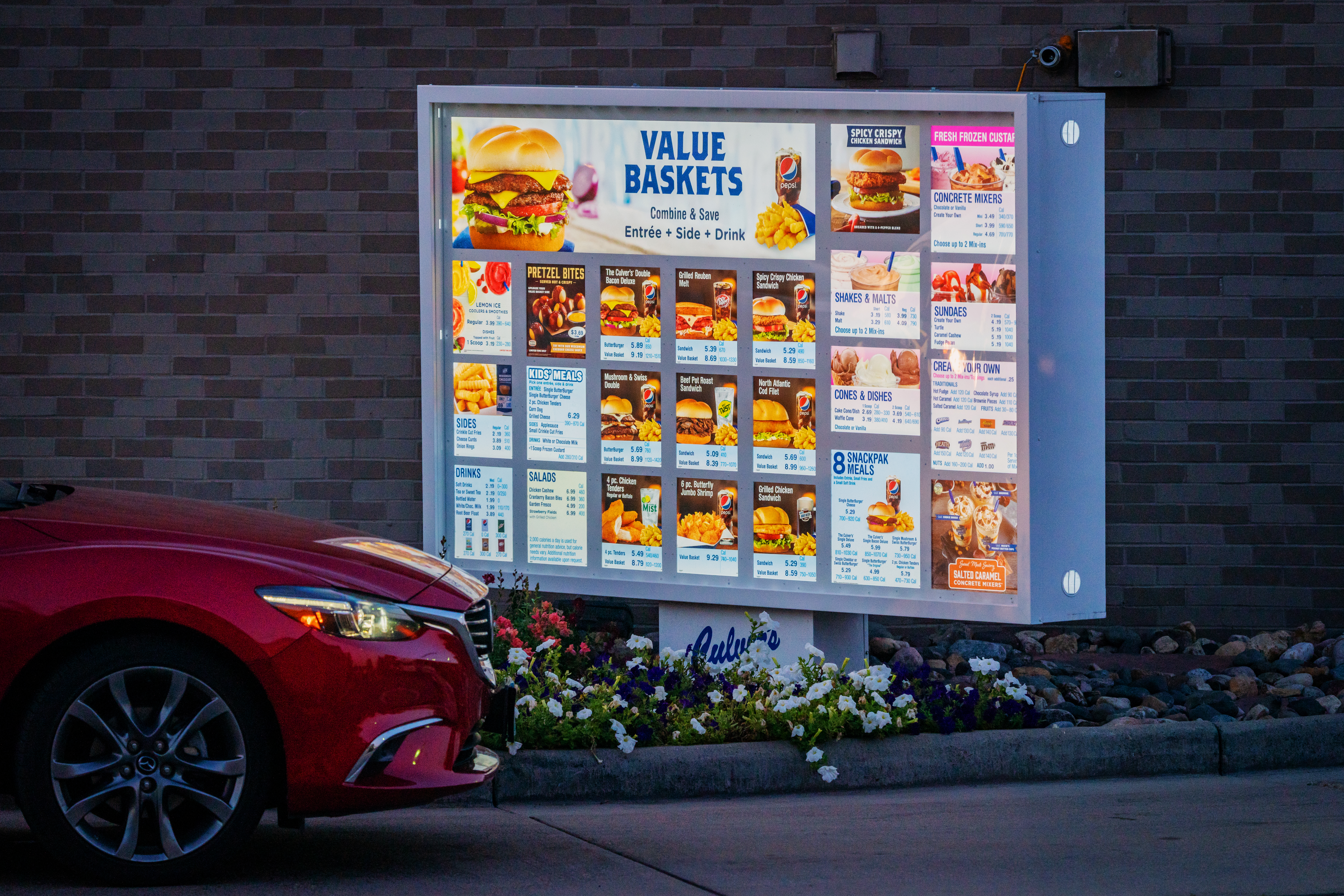
A car at the drive-thru order speaker and a DOMB at a Culver's restaurant in Shakopee, Minnesota

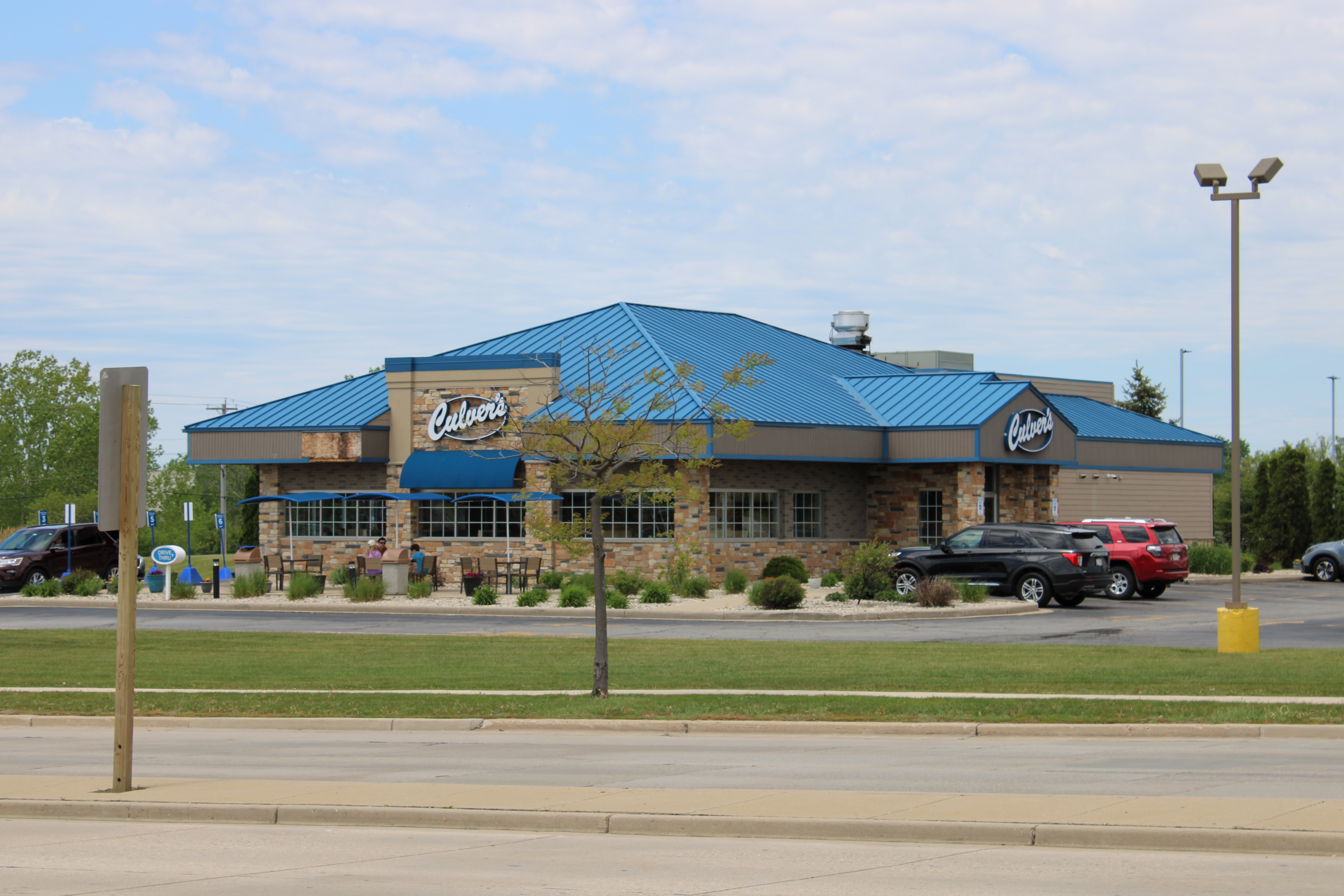
A Culver's restaurant in Oak Creek, Wisconsin

Culver's was still a small, local chain in 1993, with only 14 restaurants across southern Wisconsin. Their first restaurants outside Wisconsin opened in Buffalo, Minnesota in September 1995, Roscoe, Illinois in December 1995, and Dubuque, Iowa in November 1997.

=== Beyond the Midwest ===
Number of Culver's stores per state, as of February 2023

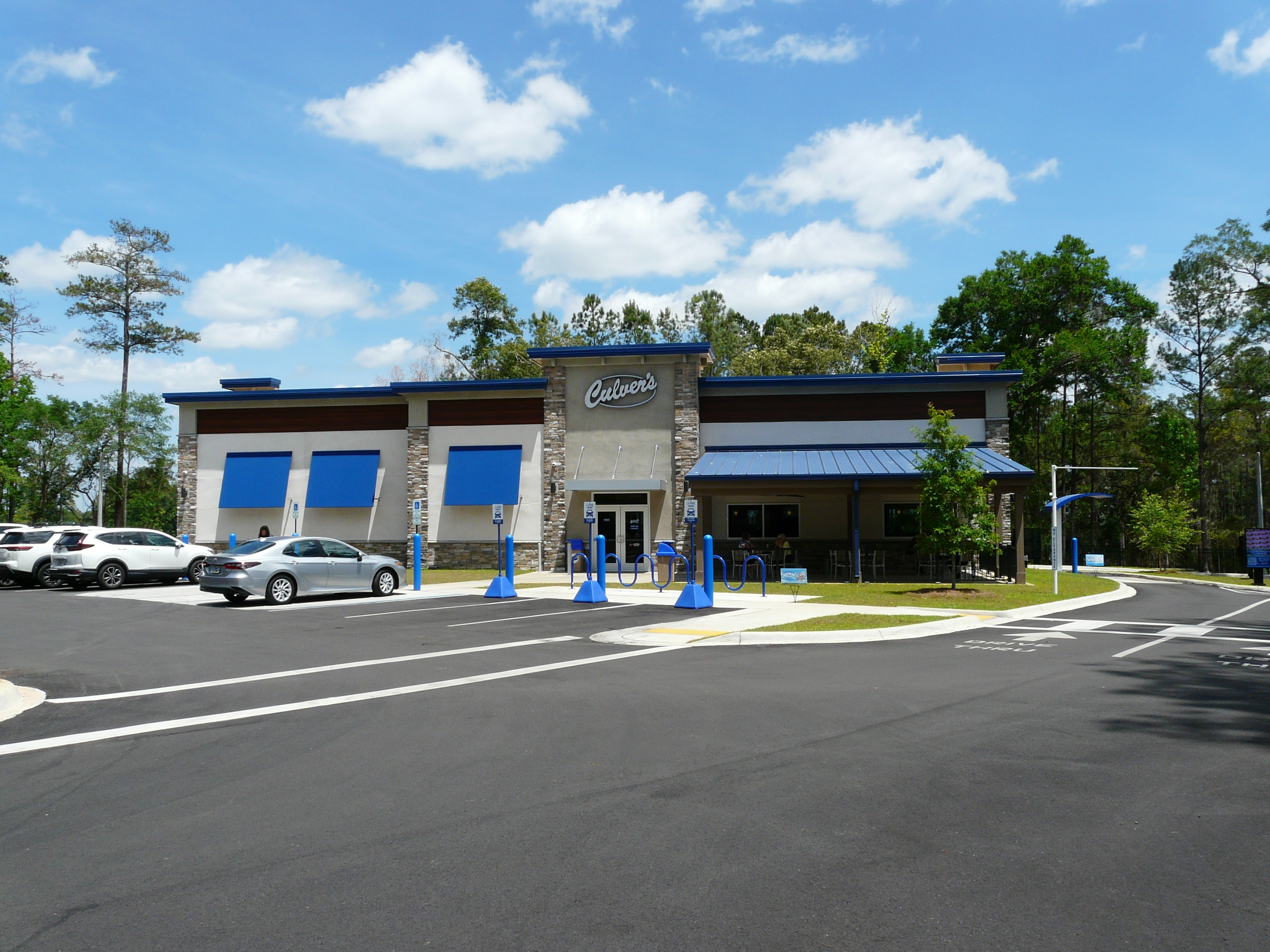
A Culver's in Bradfordville, Florida

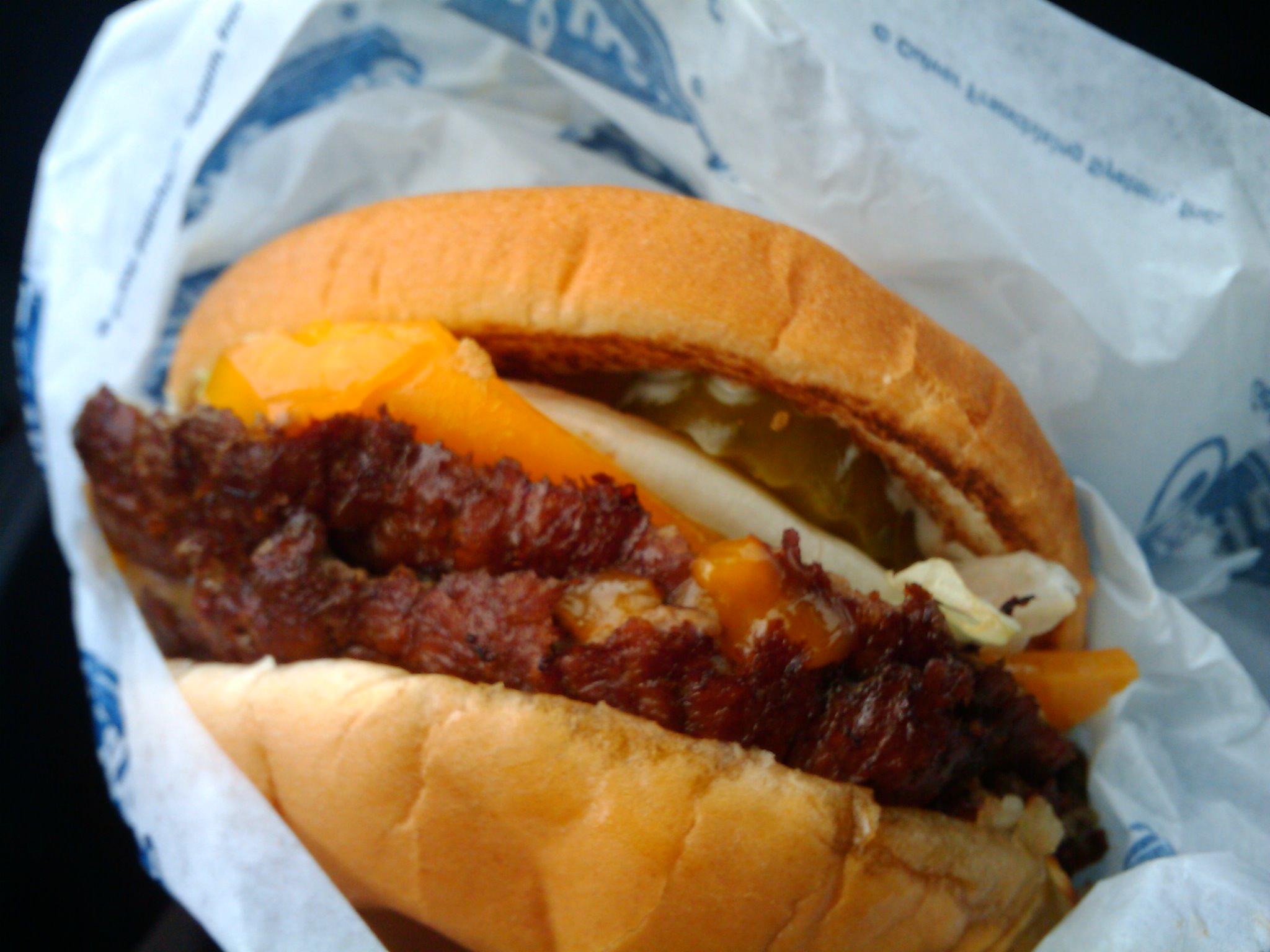
Culver's Double Butterburger with Cheddar

Culver's soon shifted its attention to developing markets beyond the Midwest, and opened the first franchise outside the region in Texas in February 1998. The current franchising strategy is one of strategic expansion. The chain expanded into Colorado Springs, Colorado and Cheyenne, Wyoming in 2005, followed by an opening in Bowling Green, Kentucky in July 2006.

Locations traditionally had a 120-seat format through much of Culver's expansion. The Metro-98 prototype was developed in 2006 and first constructed in Fort Dodge, Iowa. While the new layout has less seating to offer guests, it also reduced the amount of land needed for construction by around 20%.

The company expanded to the Phoenix metropolitan area in 2008. The first franchise in Utah opened in Midvale in 2011, when a couple from Wisconsin relocated there. They signed a development agreement for four locations in the southern half of Salt Lake County.

By the end of 2011, 445 Culver's restaurants were open in 19 states. They opened in South Carolina in 2012; Florida, Georgia, and Tennessee in 2014; and North Carolina in 2015. A location was announced for Alabama in June 2018, and expansion continued into Arkansas in January 2022.

In February 2026, Culver's announced plans to enter the Virginia market, starting with their first location in the Richmond area.

=== Blue Spoon Creamery Cafe ===
Culver's opened a new spinoff soup-sandwich-salad restaurant in Prairie du Sac, Wisconsin in 2000, called Blue Spoon Creamery Cafe. The name came from the color of the spoons used at the Culver's fast food restaurants. A second store in Middleton, Wisconsin, was open for two years, but closed in August 2010. The Prairie du Sac location closed in May 2020 during the COVID-19 pandemic shutdowns.

=== Recent developments ===
According to a 2013 survey by Franchise Business Review, Culver's was rated the best in franchisee satisfaction by franchisees.

The family sold a minority share to Roark Capital Group in October 2017, but retained majority ownership.

The company celebrated its 40th anniversary in 2024, and Wisconsin governor Tony Evers officially declared July 18 "Culver's Day" in Wisconsin.

== Leadership ==
Phil Keiser became the second CEO of the franchise in June 2015 until his death in October 2016. Joe Koss followed him in January 2017 until retiring at the end of 2020. He was succeeded by Enrique "Rick" Silva in March 2021. Silva retired in April 2025 and was replaced with Julie Fussner, the first female CEO of the company. She was previously the chief marketing officer, and had been with the company since 2017.

== Menu ==
Culver's menu consists of butter burgers, chicken sandwiches, chicken tenders, fish, salads, soup, onion rings, french fries, cheese curds, and corn dogs. For dessert, the restaurant offers its frozen custard, served in either a dish, cone, or blended into a concrete mixer, malt, or shake.

The company released an April Fools' joke in 2021 showing a large fried cheese curd in a burger bun, naming it the CurderBurger. Soon after the post was made, a change.org petition was created to make the burger a reality, gathering over 600 signatures. In celebration of National Cheese Curd Day on October 15 that year, the CurderBurger debuted, consisting of a large cheese curd on top of a burger patty. Each location only got a limited number of cheese curd patties, and all Madison, Wisconsin restaurants sold out before noon.

== Sponsorships ==
Culver's sponsors sports teams, including the Wisconsin Intercollegiate Athletic Conference (WIAC), Wisconsin Badgers, Minnesota Golden Gophers, Madison Mallards, Milwaukee Brewers, Milwaukee Bucks, Green Bay Packers, American Family Insurance Championship, Culver's Cup Hockey Tournament, Jeff Trickey QB Camps, Isthmus Bowl, and Wisconsin Junior Boys & Girls Golf Championships. Culver's also sponsors the WIAC baseball championship. The company sponsored the movie Green and Gold in 2025.

== Official mascots ==
The official Culver's mascot is an anthropomorphic custard cone named Scoopie, featured in various advertisements, community events, and fundraisers. Three new characters have been added: Curdis the Curd and Goldie the Curd in 2018 and Sundae the Turtle in 2022.

== See also ==
- List of frozen custard companies
- List of hamburger restaurants
