= PDF Solutions =

American information technology company

PDF Solutions, Inc.
- Type: Public
- Traded as: Nasdaq: PDFS; S&P 600 Component
- Industry: Big Data Analytics; Semiconductor
- Founded: 1991; 35 years ago
- Founders: John K. Kibarian; Kimon W. Michaels
- Headquarters: Santa Clara, California, United States
- Key people: John K. Kibarian (CEO & president); Kimon W. Michaels (vice president); Andrzej Strojwas (Chief Technologist)
- Revenue: US$ 165.8 million (2023)
- Website: www.pdf.com

PDF Solutions, Inc. is an American multinational software and engineering services company based in Santa Clara, California. The company is listed in the Nasdaq stock exchange under the ticker symbol PDFS.

== History ==
PDF Solutions was co-founded in 1991 by John Kibarian and Kimon Michaels. Kibarian was appointed CEO in 2000, and in July 2001, the company went public.

== Acquisitions ==
In October 2006, PDF Solutions purchased Si Automation for $26.6 million in cash.

In 2019, the company purchased assets from StreamMosaic.

PDF Solutions acquired Cimetrix Incorporated in November 2020. In July 2023, the company acquired Lantern Machinery Analytics.

== Corporate affairs ==
=== Financial results ===
The following is an overview of the main financial results from recent years:

Data	2016	2017	2018	2019	2020	2021	2022	2023
Net revenues (in million)	$107.461	$101.871	$85.794	$85.585	$88.064	$111.060	$148.549	$165.835
Net income (in million)	$9.103	-$1.337	-$7.716	-$5.418	-$40.363	-$21.488	-$3.429	$3.105

== Products and services ==
According to PDF Solutions the company currently serves more than 500 clients in 36 countries, including brands like TSMC, Intel, Analog Devices and Qualcomm. Clients come from the fields of foundries, semiconductor design companies and equipment manufacturers.

The company produces software, hardware and semiconductor-based intellectual property (IP) to provide advanced data management and analytics that support the manufacturing and testing of integrated circuits and systems on chips used in electronic devices such as smartphones, computers and the advanced driver assistance systems (ADAS) of modern automobiles.

== See also ==
- Electronic design automation
- Computer-aided manufacturing
