= Value-added reseller =

Company enhancing a product for resale

A value-added reseller (VAR) is a company that adds features or services to an existing product, then resells it (usually to end-users) as an integrated or complete "turnkey" product. This practice occurs commonly in the electronics or IT industry, where, for example, a VAR might bundle a software application with supplied hardware.

The added value can come from professional services such as integrating, customizing, consulting, training and implementation. The value can also be added by developing a specific application for the product designed for the customer's needs which is then resold as a new package. VARs incorporate platform software into their own software product packages.

The term is often used in the computer industry, where a company purchases computer components and builds (for example) a fully operational personal computer system usually customized for a specific task (such as non-linear video editing). By doing this, the company has added value above the cost of the individual computer components. Customers would purchase the system from the reseller if they lacked the time or experience to assemble the system themselves. Tandy Corporation was an example of a company that sold products through VARs, using relabeled versions of its computers. The relationships VARs have with their customers can be the reason for acquisitions, such as IBM's purchase of Informix Corporation.

== See also ==
- Original equipment manufacturer (OEM)
