= James M. Feigley =

United States Marine Corps general

James M. Feigley is a retired brigadier general in the United States Marine Corps.

== Career ==
Feigley joined the Marine Corps in 1972. Assignments he was given include serving as Project Manager for Headquarters Marine Corps and the Naval Sea Systems Command and Commander of the Marine Corps Systems Command. He retired in 2002.

== Education ==
- B.S. - University of Wisconsin-Oshkosh

== Awards and decorations ==
During his military career he was awarded the following, among others: Distinguished Service Medal, Legion of Merit, Meritorious Service Medal with gold star, Navy Commendation medaland, Navy Achievement Medal with gold star.
