= Cattle Baron's Ball =

American Cancer Society fundraiser in Texas

The Cattle Baron's Ball in Dallas is the largest single-night fundraiser hosted by the American Cancer Society. $105 million has been raised for cancer research since the first Ball in 1974. Each year, the event has a specific theme and provides entertainment, including performances by several country artists. Participants must be a minimum age of 21 and buy a ticket before the event.

Due to the event's success, the Ball has expanded across the United States, including Colorado, Florida, Indianapolis, Kansas, Louisiana, Missouri, Oklahoma, Virginia, and other parts of Texas.

== Features ==
Cattle Baron's Ball vary, but common features include:

- Silent Auctions
- Live Auctions
- Raffles
- Performances by country artists

The Ball typically holds a raffle featuring luxury items donated by sponsors and partners, which have included Park Place Porsche, Christie's, Winstar World Casino, and Eisemann Jewelers.

Several of Country music's performers have entertained at the ball throughout its 35+ year history, including Tammy Wynette, Johnny Cash, Willie Nelson, George Strait, Waylon Jennings, Brooks & Dunn, Clint Black, Dwight Yoakam, Big & Rich, Toby Keith, Sugarland and Brad Paisley, among many others.

== History ==
Patti Hunt and Jacque Wynne hosted the first Cattle Baron's Ball in 1974. Held at Toddie Lee Wynne's Star Brand Ranch, the event was attended by 500 guests and raised $56,000. In 2009, the Cattle Baron's Ball at South Fork Ranch raised $3.5 million. The Ball has generated $105 million in 51 years.
