= Craig Culver =

American fast food company founder

- Born: June 15, 1950 (age 75); Neenah, Wisconsin, U.S.
- Education: University of Wisconsin–Oshkosh
- Occupations: Co-founder and co-owner of Culver's
- Spouse: Katie Culver
- Children: 3

Craig Culver (born June 15, 1950) is an American businessman who is the co-founder of the Culver's, a United States-based fast casual restaurant. He founded the first Culver's in 1984 with his parents, George and Ruth, along with his former wife, Lea, in Sauk City, Wisconsin. The Culver's franchise has grown to over 26 states as of March 2025.

== Early life ==
Culver was born in Neenah, Wisconsin. In 1961, his parents purchased an A&W fast-food restaurant in the middle of downtown Sauk City. After graduating from the Sauk Prairie High School, Craig decided to go to University of Wisconsin–Oshkosh, graduating with a bachelor's degree in biology. In 1968, Craig's parents purchased the "Farm Kitchen" resort at Devil's Lake State Park. Over his college breaks and during the summer, Craig worked at his parents' resort. He met his wife, Lea, at this resort. They later married and have three daughters together.

== Entry into business ==
As soon as Craig Culver graduated from college in 1973, he became a manager at a McDonald's fast-food restaurant. A few years later, Culver and his parents purchased the same A&W fast-food restaurant that they had owned over 20 years ago. The family renovated the restaurant, painting the walls white and the roof blue, in order to create a distinguished look, different from other fast food restaurants.

The first restaurant was not an immediate success. Culver has an anti-automatized sentiment in his stores, with the idea that personal touch sets Culver's apart from other competitors. The staple item is a butter burger, which is inspired by other burgers in Wisconsin topped with butter. The company has not changed its technique to make its butter burgers, which involves buttering the top bun. Culver has grown the company from a single store to over $8 billion dollars in revenue.

== Later life ==
Craig retired as CEO of the franchise in 2015. His successor was announced to be Phil Keiser. Culver's successor's promotion took place on June 15, 2015, on Culver's 65th birthday. Culver is still the board chairman at the corporate level, and is still the face of the brand. He continues to speak at schools and universities, in which he describes his business journey.

== Personal life ==
Culver has donated over $24,000 to several political campaigns and organizations. Some notable contributions include: a $500 donation to Former Wisconsin Governor Scott Walker (R), a $250 donation to Michigan Governor Gretchen Whitmer (D), a $1,000 donation to 2024 US Senate candidate for Wisconsin Eric Hovde (R), a $1,000 donation to Wisconsin Senator Ron Johnson (R), a $2,500 donation to Former Wisconsin Governor Jim Doyle (D), and two $500 donations (one in 1997, one in 1998) to Former Wisconsin Governor Tommy Thompson (R).

Culver imposed requirements on franchise owners in order to benefit the community. Owner-operators are required to work in the restaurant, and are also required to give money back to the community. The Culver's corporation founded the "Thank You Farmers Project", which benefits family farms.
