= Integrated software =

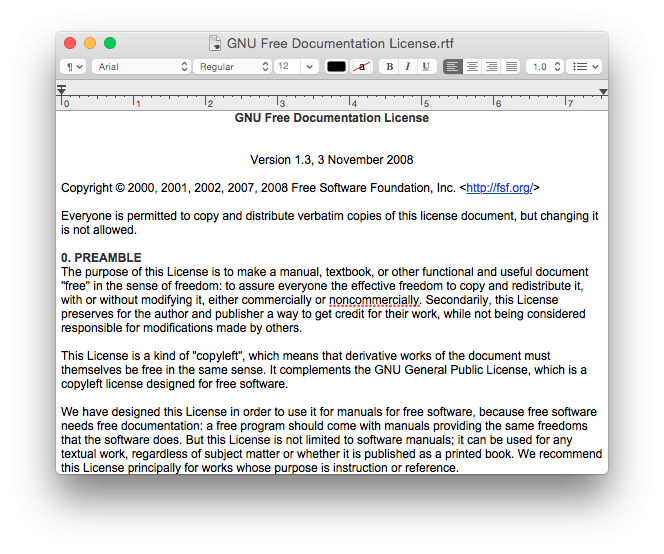
TextEdit, bundled with Macs since 1996, integrates a GUI WYSIWYG word processor and plain text editor

Integrated software is a software for personal computers that combines the most commonly used functions of many productivity software programs into one application.

The integrated software genre has been largely overshadowed by fully functional office suites, most notably Microsoft Office, but at one time was considered the "killer application" type responsible for the rise and dominance of the IBM PC in the desktop business computing world.

In the early days of the PC before GUIs became common, user interfaces were text-only and were operated mostly by function key and modifier key sequences. Every program used a different set of keystrokes, making it difficult for a user to master more than one or two programs. Programs were loaded from floppy disk, making it very slow and inconvenient to switch between programs and difficult or impossible to exchange data between them (to transfer the results from a spreadsheet to a word processor document for example). In response to these limitations, vendors created multifunction "integrated" packages, eliminating the need to switch between programs and presenting the user with a more consistent interface.

The convenience of an all-in-one purchase as well as the potential for greater ease-of-use made integrated software attractive to home markets as well as business, and packages such as the original AppleWorks for the Apple II, Vizastar for the Commodore 64 and Jane for the Commodore 128 were developed in the 1980s to run on most popular home computers of the day. Commodore even produced the Plus/4 computer with a simple integrated suite built into ROM.

Context MBA was an early example of the genre, and featured spreadsheet, database, chart-making, word processing and terminal emulation functions. However, because it was written in Pascal for portability, it ran slowly on the relatively underpowered systems of the day. Lotus 1-2-3, which followed it, had fewer functions but was written in x86 assembler, providing it with a speed advantage that allowed it to become the predominant business application for personal computers in the 1980s.

BYTE asked in 1984, "Why should owners of advanced, multifunction business programs that are supposedly easy to use and that claim to solve all problems be compelled to purchase a utility like Sidekick? It makes you wonder about all those advertising claims." Perhaps Framework and Symphony represented the peak of integrated software products, amid questions about the genre's viability under the new graphical user interfaces. The GUI on a Macintosh or Microsoft Windows, based around a desktop metaphor and typically enforcing a set of user interface guidelines for developers, enjoyed much greater consistency between standalone applications, removing one of the main motivations behind integrated packages. Microsoft stated in 1985 that hardware limited the power of all-in-one programs, and that simultaneously using multiple applications like Excel under Switcher on the Macintosh—with common user interfaces and ability to share data—was preferable to "fully integrated" software. Jerry Pournelle agreed, adding that "it's going to be difficult to sell full integration to users. There's just too much to learn. Old hands looking for an improved text editor may not care to change spreadsheets. Newcomers almost certainly won't want to learn about spreadsheets, databases, text editors, and communications all at once." Also, "users want to be able to pick and choose programs according to their particular needs".

PC Magazine said in 1993 that "reports of the death of integrated software under Windows have been greatly exaggerated", however, because the realities of software development and market considerations made integrated software still attractive to notebook owners, home and small-business users, and others. Microsoft developed its own suite, Works, for such customers, with Claris's ClarisWorks as a competitor. Developers of standalone products introduced integrated versions with additional abilities like Wordperfect Works, which was based on an earlier competitor to AppleWorks made by Beagle Bros. The 1990s also saw the rise of the office suite concept exemplified by Microsoft Office and LibreOffice in the 2010s, which resemble integrated software but involve more complex software with greater abilities that, in many cases, are also sold as standalone products.

== See also ==
- Comparison of office suites
