= MacUser (US edition) =

Defunct computer magazine

- Premier edition front cover
- Categories: Computing, Macintosh
- Frequency: Monthly
- Founded: 1985
- Final issue: 1997
- Company: Ziff Davis
- Country: United States
- Language: English
- ISSN: 0884-0997

MacUser was a monthly computer magazine published by Ziff Davis in the United States, while the UK edition was published by Dennis Publishing.

== History and profile ==
MacUser started publication in late 1985 as a four-color monthly and contained general interest Mac articles. In 1986 the magazine was acquired by Ziff Davis. It had reviews and regular columns for novice and experienced users with a more humorous view of the Macintosh world than other publications of the time. Games were reviewed as well as business and productivity software. A unique feature, not available in other publications, was the inclusion of about 250 capsule reviews in each edition.

The initial cover price was $3.50, with an annual subscription of $23 (or $42 for two years.)

In 1997, the publication was absorbed into Macworld as Macworld, incorporating MacUser (a name reflected subtly on the magazine's Table of Contents page) reflecting a consolidation of the Ziff Davis-owned MacUser magazine into the International Data Group-owned Macworld within the new Mac Publishing joint venture between the two publishers.

== See also ==
- MacUser
