= Michael Tomczyk =

American businessman and home computer pioneer

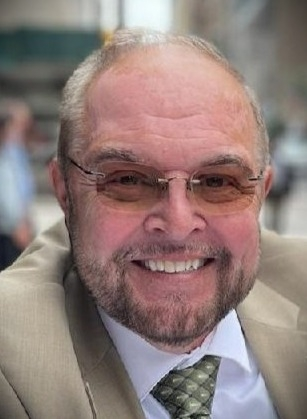
- Born: Oshkosh, Wisconsin
- Occupation: Businessperson/Disruptive Innovator
- Years active: 1970-present
- Known for: Product managing the VIC-20, the first (Commodore) home computer, for 18 years served as Managing Director of innovation research initiatives at the Wharton School
- Notable work: NEO-INNOVATION: Ideas, Insights and Tools to Compete in a New Era (Springer 2024); Nano-Innovation: What Every Manager Needs to Know (Wiley 2014); The Home Computer Wars: An Insider's True Story of Commodore and Jack Tramiel (Compute!Books 1984)

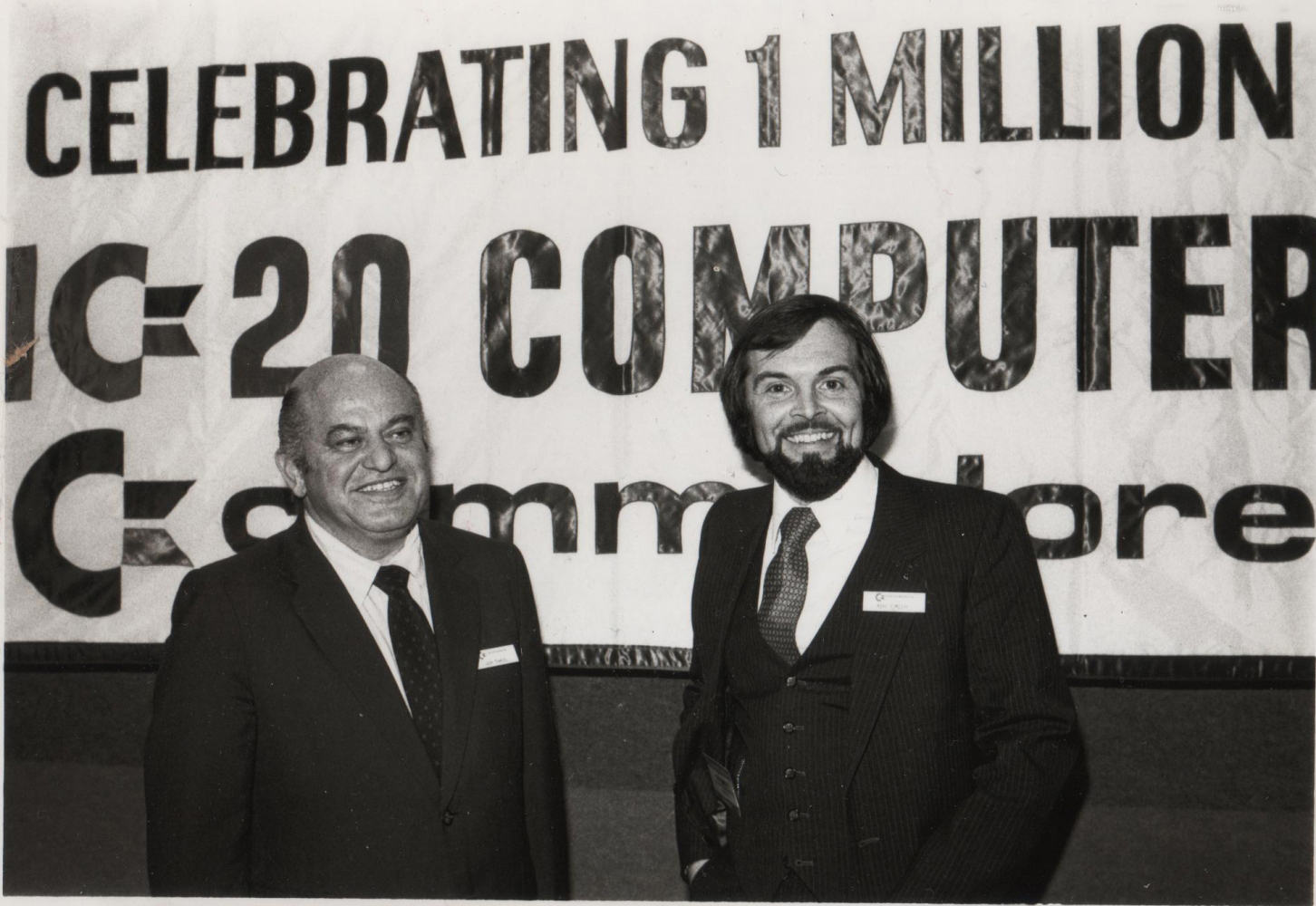
With Jack Tramiel (left), 1982

Michael S. Tomczyk is best known for his role in guiding the development and launch of the first microcomputer to sell one million units, as Product Manager of the VIC-20 from Commodore. Tomczyk joined Commodore in April 1980 as Assistant to the President. He has been called the "marketing father" of the home computer. Tomczyk was also co-designer of the Commodore VICModem, which he conceived and contracted while at Commodore. The VICModem was the first modem priced under $100 and the first modem to sell one million units.

Tomczyk is the author of the 2016 book, NANOINNOVATION: What Every Manager Needs to Know (Wiley, 2016) and in 2016 he served on the NNI Review Committee (National Academy of Sciences) He is Senior Advisor to FAMA Financial Holdings, a FinTech venture focused on developing mobile money platforms and applications. In Fall 2021 he became a founding director of a Fintech Ecosystem Development Corporation, a developer of global mobile payment services and digital banking innovations.

== Early life and education ==
He holds an MBA. from UCLA and a BA from the University of Wisconsin–Oshkosh, where he received a Distinguished Alumni Award. He earned a master's degree in environmental studies from the University of Pennsylvania in May 2010.

Michael Tomczyk served three years in the U.S. Army (1970-73 - highest rank Captain), working for military commands including the XVIII Airborne Corps (Ft. Bragg), 1st Signal Brigade (Vietnam) and USASTRATCOM/United Nations Command (Korea). As Public Information Officer at Fort Bragg, he helped launch the Volunteer Army (VOLAR) which was being piloted in 1970. He experienced combat and was awarded the Bronze Star for meritorious service in Vietnam (1971–72). He received the Army Commendation Medal for service in Korea (1973). He served in the Army Reserve after active duty.

== Commodore ==
In early 1980, Tomczyk joined Commodore as Marketing Strategist and Assistant to the President (Commodore founder Jack Tramiel). When Tramiel announced that he wanted to develop a low cost affordable home computer "for the masses, not the classes," Tomczyk embraced the concept and aggressively championed the new computer. The concept for the new computer was born at a Commodore management conference at the Fox and Hounds estate outside London, England, the first week in April 1980. Despite his status as the newest member of the management team, Tomczyk vigorously championed the home computer and on his return to Santa Clara, California, he wrote a 30-page single spaced memo to Tramiel, detailing specifications, pricing, features and design innovations that he thought should be included. Tramiel was impressed and put Tomczyk in charge of guiding the development and market development of the new computer.*

Tomczyk named the new computer the "VIC-20" and set the price at $299.95. Tomczyk was given the additional title of "VIC Czar" (at a time when Washington had an "Energy Czar").

Tomczyk recruited a product management team he called the "VIC Commandos" and implemented a variety of innovations including a unique user manual, programming reference guide (which he co-authored), software on tape and cartridge, as well as a distinctive array of packaging, print ads and marketing materials. His motto for the VIC Commandos was "Benutzerfreundlichkeit" which means User Friendliness in German. The new computer was introduced at Seibu Department Store as the VIC-1001 in Tokyo in September 1980, and as the VIC-20 at the Consumer Electronics Show in 1981; and subsequently in Canada, Europe and Asia. The VIC-20 became the first microcomputer to sell one million units.

In 1981 Tomczyk established the Commodore Information Network, an early implementation of a user community. He contracted the engineering for (and co-designed) the VICModem, which became the first modem priced under $100, and the first to sell one million units. To promote telecomputing, he negotiated free telecomputing services from CompuServe, The Source (online service) and Dow Jones. In 1982, the Commodore network was the largest traffic "site" on CompuServe. The Commodore Information Network has been called an early Internet style user community, before innovations in the graphic user interface brought the Internet to life.

== Later career ==
Tomczyk and 34 other employees left Commodore in 1984, whose R&D had essentially evaporated with every internal project being cancelled. This was six months after Jack Tramiel left the company for Atari. Tomczyk did go to a dinner with Tramiel, but was told Tramiel would run Atari as a family business, and that there "was no role there" for him.

In 1995 he joined the Wharton School as Managing Director of the Emerging Technologies Management Research Program at the Wharton School. In 2001, the ET Program was expanded to the Mack Center for Technological Innovation, which in 2013 became the Mack Institute for Innovation Management. Tomczyk left the Mack Institute in October 2013 and retired from the University of Pennsylvania in June 2014.

As Managing Director of the Mack Institute, Tomczyk served as a bridge between academia and industry partners. For more than 12 years he hosted an annual event he originated, called the Emerging Technologies Update Day, which showcased radical innovations looming on the near horizon that had the potential to transform industries and markets. In 2000 he helped launch the BioSciences Crossroads Initiative and in 2006 co-authored (with Paul J. H. Schoemaker) a major research report entitled: "The Future of BioSciences: Four Scenarios for 2020 and Their Implications for Human Healthcare" (May 2006). He has written articles about gene therapy, Internet applications, and many other technologies. Michael edited the Mack Institute's website and an electronic newsletter; taught sessions on radical innovation in the Wharton Executive Education Program and taught classes in Wharton's MBA program and at the UPENN School of Engineering. For almost a decade he served on the Commercialization Core committee developing translational medicine at the University of Pennsylvania Medical School.

While at Wharton, Tomczyk helped launch five technology startups, as an advisor and/or board member. For several years, he served on the advisory group for the Advanced Computing department at Temple University.

In the early 2000s he served on the leadership committee for the IEEE/IEC initiative which developed standards for Nanotechnology and is a founding strategic advisor of the Nanotechnology Research Foundation. His interest in nanotechnology led him to write a book entitled "NanoInnovation: What Every Manager Needs to Know," published by Wiley in December 2014. As part of his research for the book, he interviewed more than 150 nanotechnology scientists, entrepreneurs and leaders in business and government.

In July 2014, Tomczyk was appointed Innovator in Residence at Villanova University's ICE Center (Innovation, Creativity and Entrepreneurship). At Villanova, he hosts innovation events, teaches and advises students, and works with industry partners. In December 2014 he designed and co-hosted the first annual Villanova Innovation Update Day, a showcase for emerging technologies and applications that are changing industries and markets.

In June 2015, he was appointed to the 15-member Triennial Review Committee that will review and provide recommendations for the National Nanotechnology Initiative. In 2020 and 2021 he helped launch 2 Fintech startups (FamaCash and Fintech Ecosystem Development Corp.)

Tomczyk is a Senior Advisor and co-founder at SMC Labs, an entrepreneurial venture that developed a patented scalable blockchain platform called "TOI CHAIN". He is a former member of the board of directors of Fintech Ecosystems Development Corporation (NASDAQ:FEXD) (2021-2024).

== Publications ==
Tomczyk began his career as a journalist and has published more than 150 articles, including a monthly column (as Contributing Editor) for Export Today; a column on BASIC programming for Compute's Gazette (The VIC Magician).; a business how-to column for the West Chester Daily News; and articles for Associated Press, the New York Times, Stars and Stripes, and many other publications. In 2005 he co-edited (with Paul Schoemaker) a 134-page research report entitled: The Future of BioSciences: Four Scenario for 2020 and Their Implications for Human Healthcare. In 2011, he authored a chapter entitled "Applying the Marketing Mix (5 P's) to Bionanotechnology" in the book "Biomedical Nanotechnology" (Springer 2011). His memoir (THE HOME COMPUTER WARS, 1984) has become a collectible. His book, NanoInnovation: What Every Manager Needs to Know] (Wiley, 2014) is the first in a series of books focusing on technological innovation. He contributed an essay to AFTER SHOCK, a new book (Jan 2020) commemorating the 50th anniversary of Alvin Toffler's classic book, FUTURE SHOCK. In January 2021 he contributed a book chapter to Digital Transformation in a Post-Covid World (2021/CRC Press) entitled: DOMINO EFFECT: How Pandemic Chain Reactions Disrupted Companies and Industries. His book entitled: NEO-INNOVATION: Ideas, Insights and Tools for Competing in a New Era (published in November 2024 by Springer) is an innovation handbook presenting new approaches needed to compete in post-pandemic technologies and markets. Michael also writes a monthly column for EMBEDDED, an online technology newsletter.

== Notes and references ==
- Tomczyk, Michael (2024). "NEO-INNOVATION: Ideas, Insights and Tools to Compete in a New Era:. Springer, ISBN 978-3-527-32672-3.
- Tomczyk, Michael (2014). NanoInnovation: What Every Manager Needs to Know. Wiley, ISBN 978-3-527-65004-0.
- Villanova University, (2014). The ICE Center Welcomes Michael Tomczyk as Innovator in Residence.
- Commodore Legends: Michael Tomczyk Part I (2011). MOS 6502 Blog Interview.
- Tomczyk, Michael (2011). "Applying the Marketing Mix (5 P's) to Bionanotechnology". Biomedical Nanotechnology: Methods and Protocols, Sarah Hurst (ed.), ISBN 978-1-61779-051-5.
- Schoemaker, Paul J.H. and Tomczyk, Michael (2006). The Future of BioSciences: Four Scenarios for 2020 and Their Implications for Human Healthcare.
- Tomczyk, Michael (1984). The Home Computer Wars: An Insider's Account of Commodore and Jack Tramiel. COMPUTE! Publications, Inc. ISBN 0-942386-75-2.
- A.Persidis and M.Tomczyk, Critical Issues in Commercialization of Gene Therapy. Nature Biotechnology, Vol 15, p. 689-690, 1997.
