= Enable Software =

American software company, 1984–1997

Enable Software, Inc.
- Type: Private
- Industry: Software
- Founded: 1984
- Founder: Ron Quake, Bob Hamilton
- Defunct: 1997
- Headquarters: Ballston Lake, New York, United States
- Products: Enable (office suite), PowerLine

Enable Software, Inc. was a privately held software development company based in Ballston Lake, New York, founded in 1984 by Ron Quake and Bob Hamilton. The company's flagship product was Enable, an integrated office suite for IBM PC compatibles that combined a word processor, a three-dimensional spreadsheet, a relational database and communications software in a single package. The company ceased operations in 1997.

== History ==
Enable Software launched its integrated suite in the mid-1980s, positioning it as a comprehensive productivity package for the IBM PC market at a time when most office software products were sold separately. The multi-dimensional spreadsheet component was a notable feature, allowing users to work across layered sheets rather than a flat grid.

In 1992, Enable Office was updated to add electronic mail and calendaring software. The company claimed at that time that its products had more than one million users. Enable 4.5, released in April 1992, added support for OS/2 2.0.

In 1993, the company introduced JetForm for Enable, a mail-enabled forms designer for Microsoft Windows, and PowerLine, a multi-protocol terminal client for Windows comparable to HyperTerminal.

Enable Software ceased operations in 1997. At that point approximately 190,000 active users remained on Enable products.
