= DWA =

DWA may refer to:

Companies and organisations

- Digital Watermarking Alliance
- DreamWorks Animation
- Dutch Waterski Association
- Dallas World Aquarium
- Deutsche Vereinigung für Wasserwirtschaft, Abwasser und Abfall e.V.
- DWA in Germany

Other

- A dwa is a stool of the Ashantis.
- Disk wars avengers
- Doctor Who Adventures, a children's magazine based on the BBC TV series Doctor Who
- Data Warehouse Automation, acceleration and automation of data warehouse development cycles
- Dangerous Wild Animals Act 1976- UK legislation controlling ownership of dangerous animals
- Designated Waiting Area
- Domino Web Access (IBM Lotus)
- Drinking water advisories
- Dynamic window approach, a real-time collision avoidance strategy
- Humid continental climate with monsoonal influences (hot, humid, rainy summers and cold, dry winters) according to the Köppen climate classification
