= Idera, Inc. =

Software company

- Formerly: BBS Technologies
- Type: Private
- Industry: Software acquisition
- Founded: 2000; 26 years ago
- Founder: Rick Pleczko
- Headquarters: Houston, Texas
- Area served: Texas; Australia; Austria; United Kingdom
- Key people: Randy Jacops (CEO); Steve Young (Chairman)
- Owner: HGGC; Partners Group; TA Associates
- Subsidiaries: apilayer AquaFold; Assembla; Embarcadero Technologies; Froala; FusionCharts; Gurock; IDERA; IDM Computer Solutions; Kiuwan; LANSA; PreEmptive Solutions; Precise Software; Qubole; Sencha; Ranorex GmbH; Travis CI; Uptime Software; Webyog; WhereScape; Whole Tomato; Yellowfin
- Website: www.ideracorp.com

Idera, Inc. (/aɪˈdɪərə/) is the parent company of a portfolio of brands that offer B2B software including database tools, application development tools, test management tools, and DevOps tools. It is headquartered in Houston, Texas and has offices in Australia, Austria, and the United Kingdom. It is owned by the private equity firms HGGC, Partners Group and TA Associates.

== History ==
Idera was founded in 2000 by Tien Gah "Alan" Lee to create developer tools beginning with the original JSync product. Alan was head of development and secretary of the company. The company was led by President John Mercadante and CFO Matt Jordan. In October 2003 Idera was sold to PointSecure, Inc owned by Rick Pleczko.

Rick Pleczko founded BBS Technologies in 2000. The company produced a line of server backup software products later under the name Idera, competing for business with Imceda and later Red Gate Software.

BBS acquired web hosting backup provider R1Soft in late November 2007. It existed as a separate division until 2012, when its continuous data protection product was rolled into the Idera product line as Idera Server Backup 5.0. This restructuring was accompanied by a new "pay-as-you-go" pricing model.

The company formally changed its name to Idera, Inc. in January 2012.

Idera was acquired by private equity firm TA Associates in September 2014.

On October 7, 2015, Idera, Inc. announced an agreement to acquire Embarcadero Technologies, Inc., and as of October 28, 2015, Embarcadero was listed as 'acquired'.

On May 31, 2017, HGGC bought a controlling stake.

On May 23, 2019, Partners Group made an investment in Idera.

In October 2021, both BitTitan and Perspectium were acquired by Idera.

In 2022, Yellowfin, a business intelligence and analytics software provider, was acquired by Idera. This acquisition aims to enhance Idera’s portfolio by integrating Yellowfin’s analytics capabilities.

== Subsidiaries ==
- Uptime Software, a server infrastructure monitoring tool company, was acquired in November 2014.
- Gurock, a provider of test case management software, was acquired in June 2016.
- Sencha, Inc., developers of a pure JavaScript application development framework for desktop and mobile browsers, was acquired in August 2017.
- Ranorex, a test-automation software company, was acquired in October 2017.
- Webyog, a database management tool provider, was acquired in April 2018.
- Travis CI, an open-source continuous integration company, was acquired in January 2019.
- FusionCharts, a data visualization product provider, was acquired in March 2020.
- Qubole, a multi-platform data lake company, was acquired in October 2020.
- Apilayer, a provider of real-time data API products, was acquired in January 2021.
- PreEmptive, the maker of Dotfuscator and DashO, code obfuscators for .net and Java, respectively, was acquired in March 2021.

=== Former subsidiaries ===
- Idera sold its SharePoint business to Metalogix in October 2013.

== Products ==
Idera creates tools designed to support, supplement, and augment the capabilities of Microsoft SQL Server, including SQL Diagnostic Manager, SQL Doctor, and SQL Inventory Manager. The company also offers a software as a service server backup product known as SQL Safe Backup, which allows hosting providers and others to offer their clients continuous data protection for their backups. They also offer a number of free tools for SQL Server performance, backup, and diagnostics and for Windows PowerShell.

== Recognition ==
Idera's software has a number of awards within the SQL Server and IT communities. SQL Toolbox has won several Best of TechEd Awards and some of their SQL Server offerings have placed in the SQL Server Pro Community Choice Awards. The free tool, PowerShell Plus, has won Windows IT Pro Editors' Best and Community Choice awards.
