= Danny Orleans =

American magician (born 1954)

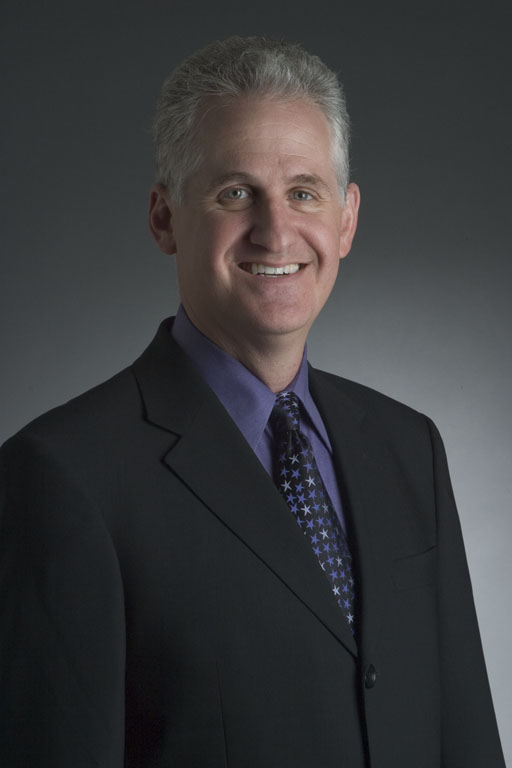
- Born: October 21, 1954 (age 70); United States
- Occupation: Magician

Danny Orleans (born October 21, 1954) is an American magician, one of the top trade-show performers, corporate entertainers, and magical educators in the country.

As a corporate and trade show performer, he has presented hundreds of magic shows for business settings over the past 25 years. He travels over 75,000 miles annually, performing at trade shows that have included the TDWI World Conference, Networld+Interop and the Embedded Systems Conference. His list of clients includes Hewlett-Packard, American Express, Aon Corporation, ExxonMobil, WhereScape and Western Union.

Orleans' path as a magician educator began when he earned his degree in Education from Northwestern University. Orleans went on to teach both Algebra and preschool at Chicago area public and private schools. From 1980 to 2000 he toured North America performing magic in thousands of schools, theaters and children's museums (including the Riverside Theatre in Vero Beach, Florida). In 2003, he won 1st place in the Chicago Close-Up Magic Competition.

Orleans has written, appeared in, or contributed to numerous instructional texts on magic, including a series of ten books and magic sets with DVDs for New York publisher, Scholastic Corporation. In 2010, Chronicle Books published an interactive magic book he created called Magic Scratchers. It is the first magic book using scratch-off technology to create the illusion that it can read the mind of the reader. He has also written on magic subjects for magicians' trade publications, Genii (magazine) and Magic (magazine).

In 2013, Mr. Orleans released a set of DVDs for the magic community entitled, The Art of Presenting Magic to Children. The success of this release gave him instant notoriety as an expert on the performance of magic to young people. In 2014, he released The Art of Presenting Magic to Teenagers.

Since then, he has written or edited additional books and ebooks for the magic community including Kids Show Masterplan, The Daycare Magician, Scrub-a-Dub-Dub, and Lights, Camera, Magic. He and his wife Jan Rose are now lecturing worldwide to magicians, educating them on the use of audience management skills and child psychology in order to make their youth performances more successful.

== Bibliography ==
- The Art of Presenting Magic to Children (3 DVD set); Danny Orleans
- The Art of Presenting Magic to Teenagers (3 DVD set); Danny Orleans
- Complete Idiot's Guide to Magic by Tom Ogden; Danny Orleans, contributor
- A Dozen Red Noses by Steve Kissell; Danny Orleans, contributor
- Funny Magic: How To Do Tricks That Make People Laugh by Tom Mason, Dan Danko, Danny Orleans, John Railing
- Instant Miracles With Everyday Objects DVD with Danny Orleans for Royal Magic
- Kids Show Masterplan by Danny Orleans
- Magic Scratchers by Danny Orleans
- Scholastic Party Magic by Danny Orleans et al.
- Secrets of the Great Magicians DVD with Danny Orleans for Royal Magic
- 3D Kid Show Lecture DVD; Danny Orleans, David Kaye, Doug Scheer
- Scrub-a-Dub-Dub by Danny Orleans and Chris Michael
- Lights, Camera, Magic by Danny Orleans, Chris Michael, Zach Alexander
- The Daycare Magician by Tom Boleware with Danny Orleans
