= Bill Larsen =

American magician (1928–1993) co-owner of The Magic Castle in Hollywood

- Born: William Walter Larsen Jr. May 8, 1928; Pasadena, California, U.S.
- Died: February 11, 1993 (aged 64); Hollywood, California, U.S.
- Other names: "The Prez"
- Occupations: Magician, businessman, TV producer, magazine editor
- Known for: co-founder of the Magic Castle

William Walter Larsen Jr. (May 8, 1928 – February 11, 1993) was an American magician and president of the Academy of Magical Arts. He was born in Pasadena, California to attorney William Larsen Sr. and TV host Geraldine Jaffe Larsen. His younger brother was Milt Larsen. After their father's death in 1953, the brothers took over publication of Genii magazine, leased the Hollywood Victorian home "Holly Chateau" and with his future wife Irene Larsen built it into the private performance venue and restaurant now called the Magic Castle where the Academy of Magical Arts is headquartered. Larsen served as president of the academy until his death in 1993. Bill and brother Milt share a star on the Hollywood Walk of Fame.

== Early life in magic ==
Larsen was born in Pasadena to Los Angeles defense attorney and magician William W. Larson Sr. and Geraldine Jaffe Larsen "Gerri Larsen" who was an early TV pioneer children's entertainer known as "The Magic Lady".

The family toured as the Larsen Family of Magicians until WWII made traveling difficult. The family settled down and opened up a magic shop in Pasadena. Larsen Sr. founded Genii magazine in 1936, a publication for magic and magicians. At William Sr.'s death in 1953 Bill Jr. and family members took over publication of the magazine.

In 1956, Bill and Milt put on their first "It's Magic!" stage event at the "Wilshire Ebell Theatre, then at the Variety Arts Center in Los Angeles" that continued as an annual event till 1984.

== Magic Castle ==
The brothers promised each other after their father's death at age 41 that they would fulfil their dads dream to open an exclusive venue for magicians. The brothers worked in television, Bill Jr. an executive producer for CBS and Milt for NBC who also wrote jokes for the TV show Truth or Consequences.

Milt discovered the three-story Victorian building "Holly Chateau" that would eventually become the Magic Castle. Bill ran the business side of things while Milt renovated the building which started out as a small close-up room and bar. The Academy of Magical Arts was run out of the Castle and Bill Larsen quit his TV job in order to manage the club and Genii magazine. The academy was overseen by an elected board which included the actor Cary Grant. Bill remained in the role of president until his death in 1993. He was affectionally called "The Prez" by his friends.

According to illusionist Peter Reveen who wrote Larsen's 1993 obituary in Genii, "Bill and Irene together, became the roving ambassadors of magic, travelling to magical events all over the world". He was "made an honorary member of every major international magical society".

== Brookledge ==
A Spanish-style mansion built in 1937 by high-end magic builder, Floyd Thayer, Brookledge is located in Hancock Park a neighborhood in the Wilshire area of Los Angeles. In 1942 Thayer traded houses with William Larsen Sr., father of Bill and Milt Larsen. Brookledge was home to Thayer's Studio of Magic whose stage was used to test illusions by magicians including Harry Blackstone Sr. and Dante the Magician. Orsen Welles used the Thayer state to rehearse for his USO shows. Live magic continued at the home until the 1950s.

In 2009, daughter of Bill and Irene, Erika Larsen reopened the theatre to the "Brookledge Follies" an invitation only vintage show, with seating for only about 70 attendees. In 2010 the Follies were meeting monthly with plans to move to a larger venue and sell tickets. Magician Rob Zabrecky acted as host, attendees included actor musician Ryan Gosling.

During the COVID-19 pandemic, Erika Larsen organized a "star-studded virtual magic fundraiser" called Brookledge Cares, with proceeds to go to the Dai Vernon foundation to help magicians affected by the pandemic. Celebrities Neil Patrick Harris, Dick Van Dyke, Paul Reubens and actor Jason Alexander plus magicians Penn & Teller and David Copperfield volunteered to help.

== Personal life ==
Not long after the Magic Castle opened, Bill married Irene Larsen on November 10, 1963 who had immigrated from Germany in the 1950s. Irene died February 25, 2016, at her Los Angeles home at the age of 79.

Along with brother Milt Larsen, he has a star on the Hollywood Walk of Fame.

== Legacy ==
Illusionist Peter Reveen writes Larsen's 1993 obituary published in Genii magazine that the world of magic was stunned at the death of Bill Larsen, Reveen calls him the "world's most beloved citizen" and "not since the loss of Harry Houdini in 1926, have magicians across the globe felt a sense of loss". Larsen, according to Reveen, took an interest in the careers of many magicians who went on to fame working in top venues. He was "totally devoid of conceit ... would become embarrassed and deflect the compliment" to someone else who Larsen felt had done more. By "nature, he was a booster and not a knocker". Larsen had no hobbies and his two passions were his family and magic. He adored his parents William and Gerri and always believed he would die early at the same age of his father 48, and was shocked he lived past 50. Anonymously, Larsen helped out many not well-known magicians who were struggling financially, and for some senior members he would have the Castle "pick up the tab for both their living and medical expenses".

Magician David Copperfield published this goodbye to Larsen, "He leaves behind a legacy of civility, kindness and generosity of spirit ... Magic and magicians the world over have lost a devoted ambassador".

Magician Mark Wilson writes that "Bill Larson was, unquestionably, the most beloved man in our world of magic. His generosity to fellow magicians who were down on their luck, with money, meals, a bed, and a "quiet booking at the Castle". He was probably the happiest man I've ever known. "He loved Irene, his family, his home ... and "Bear" the little teddy bear that traveled with Bill where ever he went. And, he loved magic and the Magic Castle".

Brother Milt Larsen in his memoriam to Bill titled "Aloha, Brother Bill" wrote "He has left this world having no enemies and thousands of friends ... A little club where magicians could 'hang out' became the Mecca of Magic for professional and amateur magicians throughout the world. The Academy of Magical Arts may have been our Dad's dream but Bill followed though on every detail and made it an organization."
