= Joyce Hunter =

American businesswoman

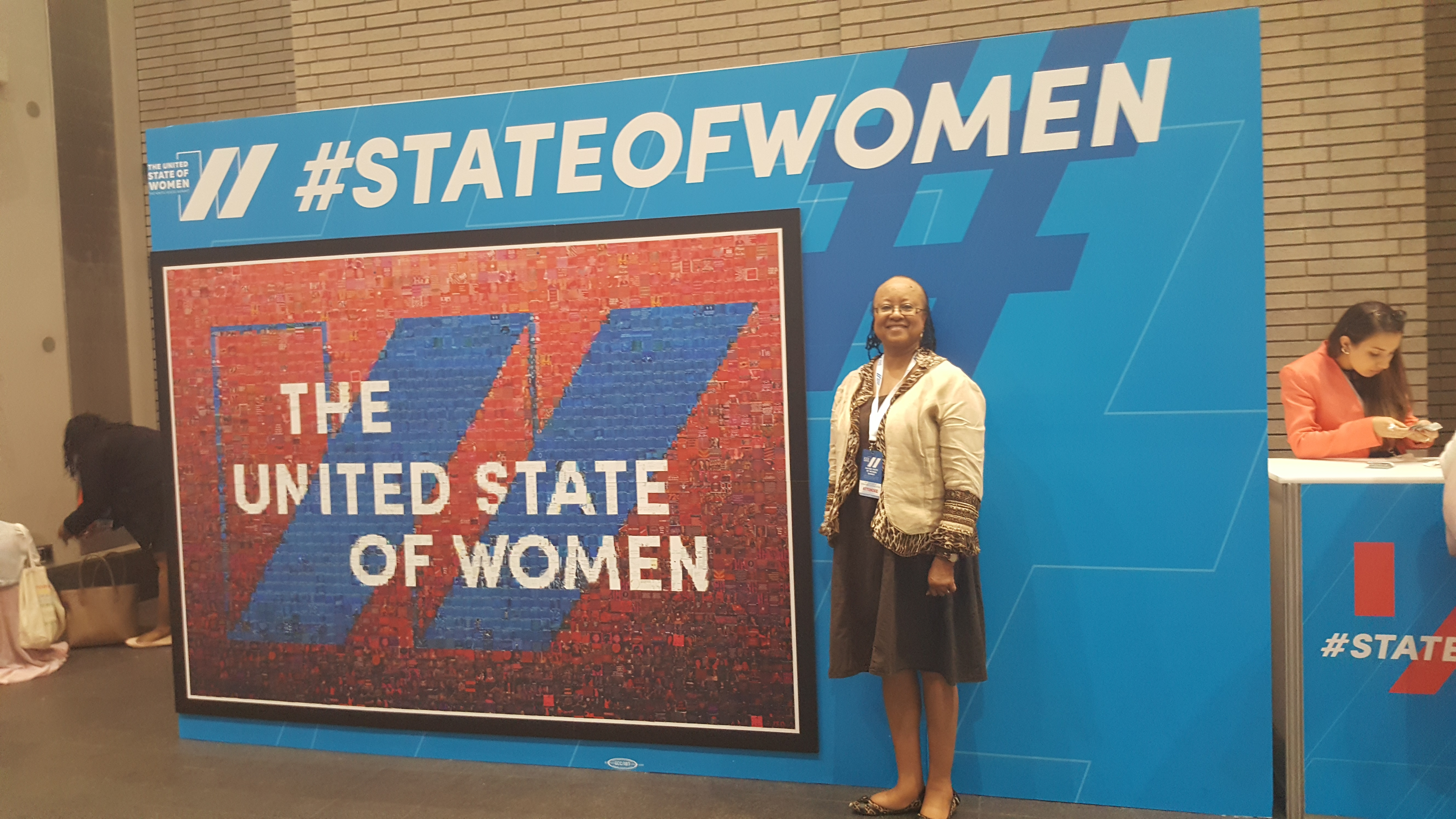

Joyce Hunter is the CEO of Vulcan Enterprises, an IT consulting firm based in Maryland. She grew up in Philadelphia, USA and in 2017, she can look back on over 30 years of work experience in the IT sector.

== Education ==
- Undergraduate degree in sociology from Villanova University
- MBA in Marketing from the University of Pennsylvania, Wharton School of Business
- Certificate in Emotional Intelligence
- Wharton Fellow

== Career ==
She did a data analytics internship at Hallmark Cards. After that, she got into the IT sales training program at Digital Equipment Corporation.

In 2009 she became the CEO of Vulcan Enterprises, after working as a Major Account Executive and Global Account Manager for ten years at Lotus Development Corporation in the 1990s. In her time there, she managed, installed, implemented and executed the worldwide installation of Lotus Notes for Ernst and Young International. Then she was appointed to become the Deputy Chief Information Officer at the Policy and Planning Departement of Agriculture (USDA) by the Obama administration.

In 2011 Hunter became the interim CEO of HavServe — a nonprofit focused on education, health and economic initiatives in Haiti.

After that she returned to her position as the CEO of Vulcan Enterprises, where she provided policy evaluation and analysis, executive advisory services, business development support, strategic business consulting, industry intelligence and business IT alignment.

In 2017 she serves on the Global Women in STEM steering committee and STEMConnector's Million Women Mentors. Furthermore, she is a director at the Piggy Bank Foundation and commits work to My Golf My Game, which is promoting diversity in the realm of golf.

== Accomplishments ==
On 21 November she gave a TedX talk in Harrisburg with the title "Agriculture is more than Beverly Hillbillies & Green Acres". In the course of her career she created the STEAM summer camps. This is a program for middle and high school students which could include urban forestry or urban agriculture.

Hunter was in 2016 and 2017 on the “D.C.’s Top 50 Women in Technology” lists of the federal technology news site FedScoop. Furthermore, in 2017, she made a contribution to a chapter of Routledge's book “The Handbook of Federal Government Leadership and Administration: Transforming, Performing and Innovating in a Complex World.”
