= Axceler =

Defunct American software company

Axceler, Inc.
- Type: Private
- Industry: Computer software
- Founded: 1994; 32 years ago
- Defunct: August 28, 2013
- Headquarters: Woburn, Massachusetts, United States

Axceler, Inc. was a software company specializing in administration, governance, and migration software for Microsoft SharePoint and Lotus Notes. It was founded in 1994 in Woburn, Massachusetts and had over 2,000 customers worldwide.

Axceler's SharePoint assets were purchased by Metalogix Software on August 28, 2013, from parent company PowerTools Inc. The sale included ControlPoint for SharePoint Administration, ControlPoint for SharePoint Migration, and ControlPoint FileLoader, among others. The portion of the business that developed, marketed, and sold solutions of IBM Notes and for collaboration visibility became a new company named ViewDo Labs.

== Products ==
Axceler's ControlPoint for SharePoint Administration was a governance and administration solution for SharePoint - on-premises, in the cloud, or in a hybrid environment - that included a governance policy manager.

Axceler offered two SharePoint migration tools - ControlPoint for SharePoint Migration (formerly Davinci Migrator) providing SharePoint migration capabilities and ControlPoint FileLoader which provided Windows file share migration into SharePoint.

In 2012, Axceler announced ViewPoint, an enterprise collaboration governance tool for platforms like SharePoint, Yammer and others.

Axceler's ControlPoint won Best SharePoint Product of 2009 from Windows IT Pro. In 2011, Axceler won the Best of Connections SharePoint Product award as well as receiving the Windows IT Pro Editors' Best Choice award.
