= Asipim =

Asante royal chair

Asipim which means "I stand firm" in Asanti twi is a royal chair in Asante society. It is a sign of power and prestige exclusively used by chiefs. Chiefs sit on it during public and private occasions as their subjects sit on the ground. Its origins are in Ghana, and it is built from wood, brass, and leather. The preference for stools as a seat kept the Asipim on a low profile. It dates between the early 19th and 20th century, dating 1875 - 1925. Asipim, meaning "I stand firm," refers to both the ruler's strength and stability.

Motifs pressed into the brass at the back of the chair delineate the owner's profile. It is usually leaned against walls when not in use.

== Construction ==
The asipim is made of wood, brass, and hide. It is believed to be modeled after 17th or 18th century chairs of English "farthingale". Ntuatires are turned brass finials that are attached to the chairs at the very top to represent an eagle's claw.

== Appearance and structure ==
They are decorated with brass tracks, caps, brass finials, and incised or stamped brass sheet. The surface on the outside is covered with leather and brass. The lower part of the chair is made out of wood with short, straight legs and four stretchers. It has a wide flat seat, a short back with no arms.

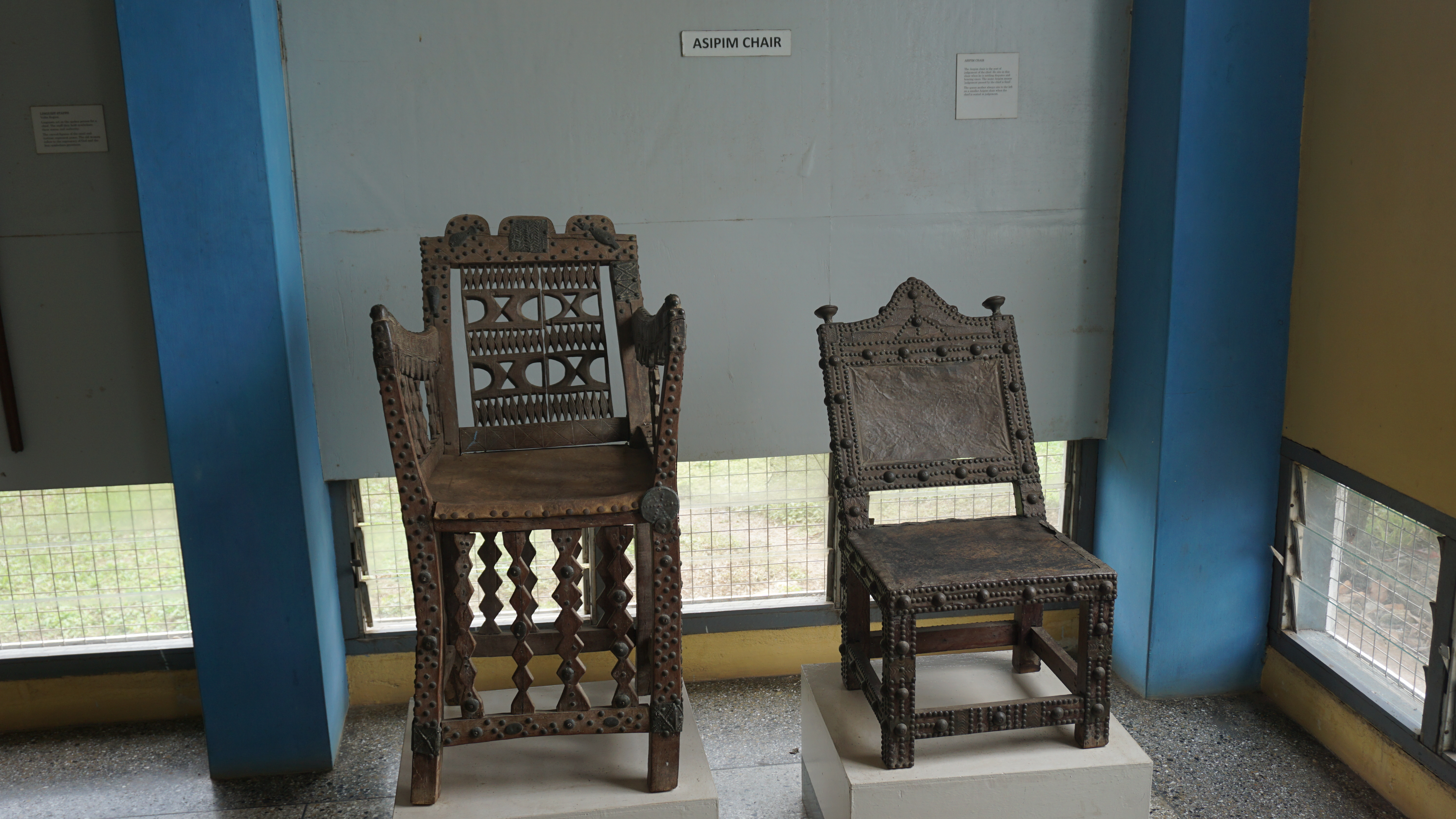
A picture of Asipim Chair
