= Irene Larsen =

Co-founder of the Magic Castle and the Academy of Magical Arts

Irene Larsen, known affectionately as “Princess Irene” throughout the worldwide community of magicians and illusionists, was a co-founder of the Magic Castle and the Academy of Magical Arts.

She was born Irene Stolz in Germany in 1936. In 1955, American magician John Daniel invited her to come up on stage to assist in a performance. She soon became a permanent part of the act. John Daniel nicknamed her “Princess Irene,” an honorary title she would keep for life, and two years later, they were married.

She divorced John Daniel in 1960 and began working as a magician's assistant to the brothers Milt Larsen and Bill Larsen. In 1963, the three of them founded the Academy of Magical Arts and the Magic Castle. She was the first member of the AMA. Later that year, she and Bill Larsen were married.

She served as an ambassador for the Magic Castle and for the magical arts in general. While continuing to serve as her husband's assistant, she also appeared on the Dean Martin Show, assisting Orson Welles with his own illusion act. She was an early and continuing voice advocating the ethical treatment of animals in magical acts. From 1963 to 1999, she served continuously as either editor or co-editor of Genii: the Conjurer's Magazine, a publication by, for, and about those in the illusionist community.
