= Bobby Lauher =

- Born: Robert Lauher; August 30, 1930; Illinois, United States
- Died: August 22, 1973 (aged 42); Tarzana, California, United States
- Occupation: Actor
- Years active: 1959–1973

Bobby Lauher (August 30, 1930 – August 22, 1973) was an American actor best known for his television skit work with Ernie Kovacs. He was a co-author of a 1971 play in L.A. that brought back Patty Andrews (of the 1940s Andrews Sisters singing act), who, because of the play, began starring in Broadway musicals in NYC in the 1970s.

== Acting career ==
Bobby Lauher appeared as a skit actor in the Ernie Kovacs game show Take A Good Look (1959–1961), and acted in the film The Blue Knight (1973).

== Playwright career ==
Bobby Lauher was a collaborator with Milt Larsen on the book for the stage musical Victory Canteen, with songs by Richard M. Sherman and Robert B. Sherman (the songwriting Sherman Brothers team famous for their Mary Poppins songs), and starring Patty Andrews (of the 1940s Andrews Sisters).

== Other credits ==
Various other credits are:

- Writer/actor on the TV game show Truth or Consequences (1960–70)
- Writer/actor on Mickie Finn's TV show (1966) and stage show (1960–69)
- Writer for the comedy act Rowan & Martin.

== Personal life ==
Bobby Lauher was born August 30, 1930, in Illinois, USA, and died August 22, 1973, in Tarzana, Los Angeles County, California, USA having drowned in his home swimming pool.
