= Golden Stool =

Throne of Asante kings

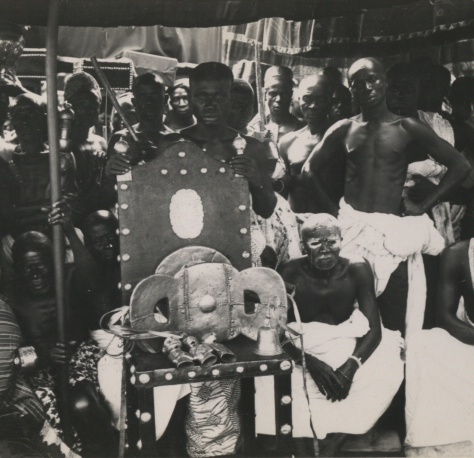
The Golden Stool on its throne, the hwedom dwa (1935)

Flag of the Asante people depicting the Golden Stool in the middle.

The Golden Stool (Ashanti-Twi: Sika dwa; full title, Sika Dwa Kofi "the Golden Stool born on a Friday") is the royal and divine throne of kings of the Asante people and the ultimate symbol of power in Asante. According to legend, Okomfo Anokye, High Priest and one of the two chief founders of the Asante Confederacy, caused the stool to descend from the sky and land on the lap of the first Asante king, Osei Tutu. Such seats were traditionally symbolic of a chieftain's leadership, but the Golden Stool is believed to house the spirit of the Asante nation—living, dead and yet to be born.

== Symbology and ritual ==
Each stool is understood to be the seat of the owner's soul and when not in use it is placed against a wall so that other souls passing by may relax on it. The Golden Stool is the royal throne and must never touch the ground; instead it is placed on a blanket. During inauguration, a new king is raised and lowered over the stool without touching it. The Golden Stool is carried to the king on a pillow, as only the Asantehene himself is allowed to handle it. During solemn occasions, the Golden Stool is placed on the king's left on a throne of its own, the hwedom dwa (Asante, throne facing the crowd).

== Historical conflict ==
Many wars have broken out over the ownership of the royal throne. In 1896, Asantehene Prempeh I was deported rather than risk losing both the war and the throne. In 1900, Sir Frederick Hodgson, the Governor of the Gold Coast, demanded to be allowed to sit on the Golden Stool, and ordered that a search for it be conducted. This provoked an armed rebellion known as the War of the Golden Stool, which resulted in the annexation of Ashanti to the British Empire, but preserved the sanctity of the Golden Stool. In 1921, African road workers discovered the stool and stripped some of the gold ornaments. They were taken into protective custody by the British, before being tried according to local custom and sentenced to death. The British intervened and the group was instead banished. An assurance of non-interference with the stool was then given by the British and it was brought out of hiding.

In 1935 the stool was used in the ceremony to crown Osei Tutu Agyeman Prempeh II.

== Appearance and craftsmanship ==
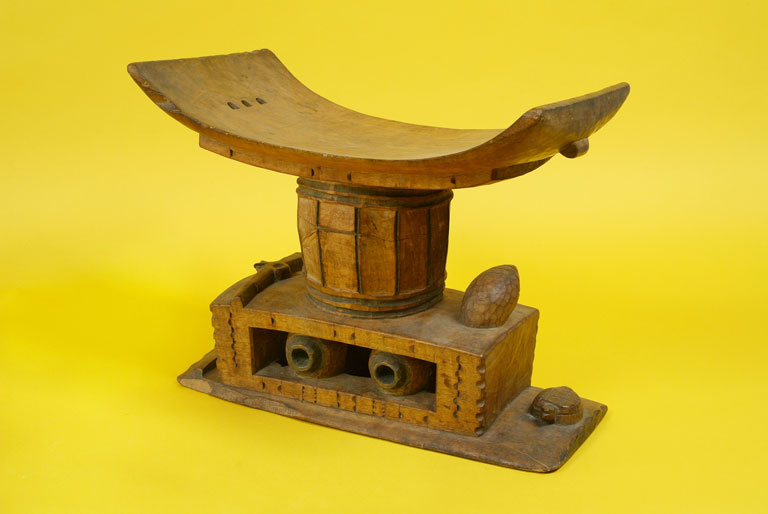
An Akan stool believed to be for a Queen mother, 1940–1965, in the collection of the Children's Museum of Indianapolis

The Golden Stool is a curved seat 46 cm high with a platform 61 cm wide and 30 cm deep. Its entire surface is inlaid with gold, and hung with bells to warn the king of impending danger. It has not been seen by many and only the king, queen, and trusted advisers know the hiding place. Replicas have been produced for the chiefs and at their funerals are ceremonially blackened with animal blood, a symbol of their power for generations. The stool is one of the main focal points of the Asante today because it still shows succession and power.

The Golden Stool is a particularly ornate example, but many similar stools were made and used. The crescent shaped seat of each is carved from a single block of the wood of Alstonia boonei (a tall forest tree with numinous associations), with a flat base and complex support structure. The many designs and symbolic meanings mean that every stool is unique; each has a different meaning for the person whose soul it seats. Some designs contain animal shapes or images that recall the person who used it. The general shape of Asante stools has been copied by other cultures and sold worldwide.
