= XPages =

Web application framework

- Developer: IBM
- Release: 2008
- Stable release: 9.0.1
- Written in: JavaScript, HTML, Java, JSF, Dojo Toolkit
- Operating system: Multiple
- Type: Web application framework
- Website: XPages.info

XPages is an IBM implementation of JavaServer Faces with a server side JavaScript runtime and the built-in NoSQL database IBM Domino. It allows data from IBM Notes and relational databases to be displayed to browser clients on all platforms.

The programming model is based on web development languages and standards including JavaScript, Ajax, Java, the Dojo Toolkit, Server-side JavaScript and JavaServer Faces. XPages uses IBM Domino, IBM's rapid application development platform, including functionality such as the document-oriented database.

== Frontend technologies ==
By utilizing web standards, XPages applications can be accessed by web clients and mobile devices, allowing the developer to deliver cross-platform applications. For the user interface, XPages focus on the web development standards HTML, CSS and JavaScript. Additionally themes can be used to manage multiple CSS files, and XPages comes with default themes, for example the OneUI theme.

For client side logic various JavaScript frameworks can be used, though XPages comes with the Dojo Toolkit and Dojo controls can be easily referenced in XPages applications. XPages also uses Dojo internally for certain functionality to make key features easier to use without having to write Dojo code. A special XPages JavaScript library contains further convenience functionality, an example being for client side field validations. In addition to client side logic, Dojo can also be used for rich user interface widgets and charts.

As any web application XPages applications can use REST services. XPages also provides easy mechanisms to bind data sources to UI controls so that for many scenarios no code needs to be written. Additionally XPages allows to declaratively only refresh parts of the page via Ajax when submitting data.

== Backend technologies ==
The development of XPages applications is done using IBM Domino Designer. With Designer many key scenarios can be implemented declaratively and rapidly, for example to render a list of entries from a database. Additionally for the business logic both JavaScript and Java code can be written. XPages base internally on JavaServer Faces, but the sources of a XPages pages are an XML derivative called XSP which is translated into Java code when running the applications. At runtime, this code returns the HTML to various clients.

In order to access data, XPages and Domino Designer use data sources. These data sources can be bound graphically to UI controls on pages. UI controls and other types of controls show up in a palette of controls in Domino Designer and can be dragged and dropped onto pages. Domino Designer also comes with further convenience functionality, such as field validations and translations. XPages functionality can be modularized in Custom Controls which are XPages controls that can be reused in multiple XPages pages and parametrized based on context.

In order to write business backend code Serverside JavaScript is used primarily. There are APIs to access the document oriented database and the XPages context. Since XPages are based on JSF and JSF is a Java standard it is also possible to invoke standard Java SDK code from the JavaScript code and to write custom Java code using JSF managed beans.

The XPages runtime can be extended using the Extensibility API which is based on JavaServer Faces. This capability can for example be used by ISVs who want to provide their own libraries of XPages controls.

== Storage: Document-oriented Database ==
The XPages runtime is part of IBM Domino and leverages the proven and mature capabilities Domino provides. Domino uses a document-oriented database called NSF (Notes Storage Facility) to manage semi-structured data like rich text and files. The data is stored as documents and views allow finding specific documents efficiently. Documents have unique ids and further built in fields like the last author, last modified date, etc. and they have custom application specific fields. Documents can contain rich text which can be formatted text and images (MIME) or full file attachments. Documents can be queried via APIs and views. Domino also supports full text search for a full database as built in feature.

XPages applications can be deployed on Domino servers or a cluster of Domino servers using IBM Domino Administrator and the replication/synchronization mechanism built into IBM Domino. The replication mechanism supports bi-directional conflict detection and resolution in distributed environments.

== Community ==
The XPages development community manages the website XPages.info with various types of information about XPages, including how to get started, downloads, resources and demos. OpenNTF is an open source site for applications based on IBM Domino, containing several applications and development controls under the Apache License.

== History ==
The origins of XPages technology can be traced as far back as year 2000. Trilog Group, an IBM Business Partner, invented a component-oriented rapid web application development model, called XSP, similar to the Domino RAD model, but based on J2EE, XML and open standards. In August 2004, IBM acquired the XSP technology assets from Trilog Group in an effort to offer a RAD tool for IBM Workplace that is similar to Domino Designer.

The XPages technology, based upon JSF and J2EE, started life at IBM, from 2005 to 2007, inside the now discontinued IBM Lotus Workplace Designer and subsequently IBM Lotus Component Designer under the code name 'XFaces'. In mid 2007, the XFaces technology became 'XPages' and adopted by IBM Lotus Notes Domino, incorporated in the development cycle for the 8.5 release. XPages was previewed at Lotusphere 2008 (AD303 Transforming IBM Lotus Domino Web Apps with IBM Lotus Domino Designer Speakers: Rocky Oliver, Martin Donnelly). IBM Lotus Notes Domino 8.5 was released in December 2008 and in time for Lotusphere 2009 where it was one of the many highlights of the show.

IBM Lotus Notes Domino 8.5.1 continued the development of the XPages technology including the running of XPages applications inside the Notes Client. This release also included several improvements to performance and UI, which helped XPages applications to better perform and scale. IBM Lotus Notes Domino 8.5.2 contained many more improvements and additions to the feature set of XPages.

The 'XPages' name was inspired from the original XSP naming idea, where XSP was actually an acronym for 'XML Server Pages'. After a first rebranding of XSP to 'XFaces', IBM chose 'XPages' as the project code name for the pre-release technology included in Domino Designer. With a catchy alternative being hard to come by, the project name stuck.
