= Peter Reveen =

Australian hypnotist and illusionist (1935–2013)

- Born: Peter James Reveen; 8 October 1935; Adelaide, Australia
- Died: 8 April 2013 (aged 77); Las Vegas, Nevada, United States
- Occupations: Illusionist; hypnotist
- Spouse: Coral Reveen
- Children: 4
- Website: reveen.website

Peter James Reveen (8 October 1935 – 8 April 2013) was an Australian illusionist and hypnotist who performed mainly in Canada, and particularly Atlantic Canada.

== Early life ==
Reveen was born in Adelaide, Australia, and traveled to the US in January 1961, landing in Honolulu, Hawaii. From there, he took a boat ride to San Francisco, California, and purchased a Greyhound Bus ticket to Vancouver, British Columbia. Reveen was granted a six-month visitor's visa on 16 March 1961.

== Career ==
Reveen began his career in the town of Chilliwack, BC, booking himself into local community halls and legions, calling himself Reveen, the Impossibilist. To promote his shows, Reveen offered complimentary tickets to all businesses willing to put a poster in their storefront window. In many towns, he also offered local radio stations a percentage of ticket sales in exchange for advertising. In 1962, The Man They Call Reveen was given the opportunity to perform in a movie house and his career took off. He toured extensively through Canada and the United States for 35 years, eventually performing for over 6,000,000 people. In September 2007, Reveen came out of retirement with a mini tour of Atlantic Canada called The Return of Reveen.

Reveen was one of the founding members of the Magic Castle in Los Angeles, California, and in 1987 wrote the book The Superconscious World. In 2000, he won the DRAGON Award, an annual award given to magicians who excel in Drama, Romance, Artistry, Glamour, Originality and Necromancy.

After Peter's death from diabetes and dementia in 2013, his son, Tyrone, continued with the "Reveen" show.

== Personal life ==
Reveen was married to Coral Reveen, who died on August 23, 2023. Together, they had four sons. From oldest to youngest, they are: Wayne, Tyrone, Calvin, and Peter, Jr. Peter Jr. is best known as the former guitar player in the now defunct American hard rock band Salty Dog.

== Cultural references ==
Samples from his self-hypnosis LPs, including Relax with Reveen, Study and Concentrate with Reveen, and Stop Smoking...Stop Overeating with Reveen, feature on some modern electronic music, such as the Lemon Jelly track Nervous Tension, and Bonobo track Shadowtricks.

Trailer Park Boys' character Ricky is occasionally called "Reveen", to Ricky's displeasure, due to their dubious physical resemblance.

Reveen appears to be the basis for a Saturday Night Live parody commercial about a hypnotist who gets audience members exiting the theatre to robotically drone, "I loved it. It was much better than CATS. I'm going to see it again and again," to a reporter.

In an episode of the Canadian sketch comedy program The Holmes Show, there is a sketch featuring Roman Danylo as a stage hypnotist named "Crevasse the Impossiblist". A crevasse is similar to a ravine and is a pun on the name "Reveen".

During his May 2009 Late Show with David Letterman appearance, comedian Norm Macdonald revealed he went to one of Reveen's shows as a teenager.

== Notable honours ==
In December 2009, IBM Ring 257 named Reveen their 2009 Magician of the Year.
