= Formula language =

The Formula language is a scripting language used by Lotus Notes. It is often referred to as @Formula language (pronounced at-formula) because many language elements start with the @-character. Here is an example of a selection formula:

SELECT @NoteId = "NT0050D26"

== Development ==
It was created by Ray Ozzie during the early development of Lotus Notes. He borrowed the compiler and decompiler from the Lotus 1-2-3 spreadsheet, but unlike the spreadsheet language Formula Language was designed primarily for string and list processing, not numerical processing. It was originally a Functional programming language with unique text list-handling features inspired by Ray Ozzie's prior use of Icon and Lisp.

The Formula language engine was rewritten by Damien Katz for Notes and Domino 6. New features were added to the language, such as looping and dynamic execution, and performance was improved.
