= FusionCharts =

Data visualization software company

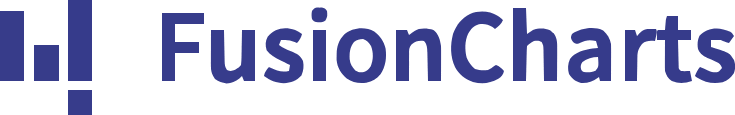
- Company logo
- Company type: Private
- Industry: Data visualization
- Founded: 2003
- Founder: Pallav Nadhani
- Headquarters: Kolkata
- Area served: Worldwide
- Revenue: ▲US$ 4.5 million (2011)
- Website: www.fusioncharts.com

FusionCharts, part of InfoSoft Global (P) Ltd, is a privately held software provider of data visualization products (JavaScript Charts, Maps, Widgets and Dashboards) with offices in Bangalore and Kolkata, India. FusionCharts serves customers in over 110 countries across various industries.

== History ==
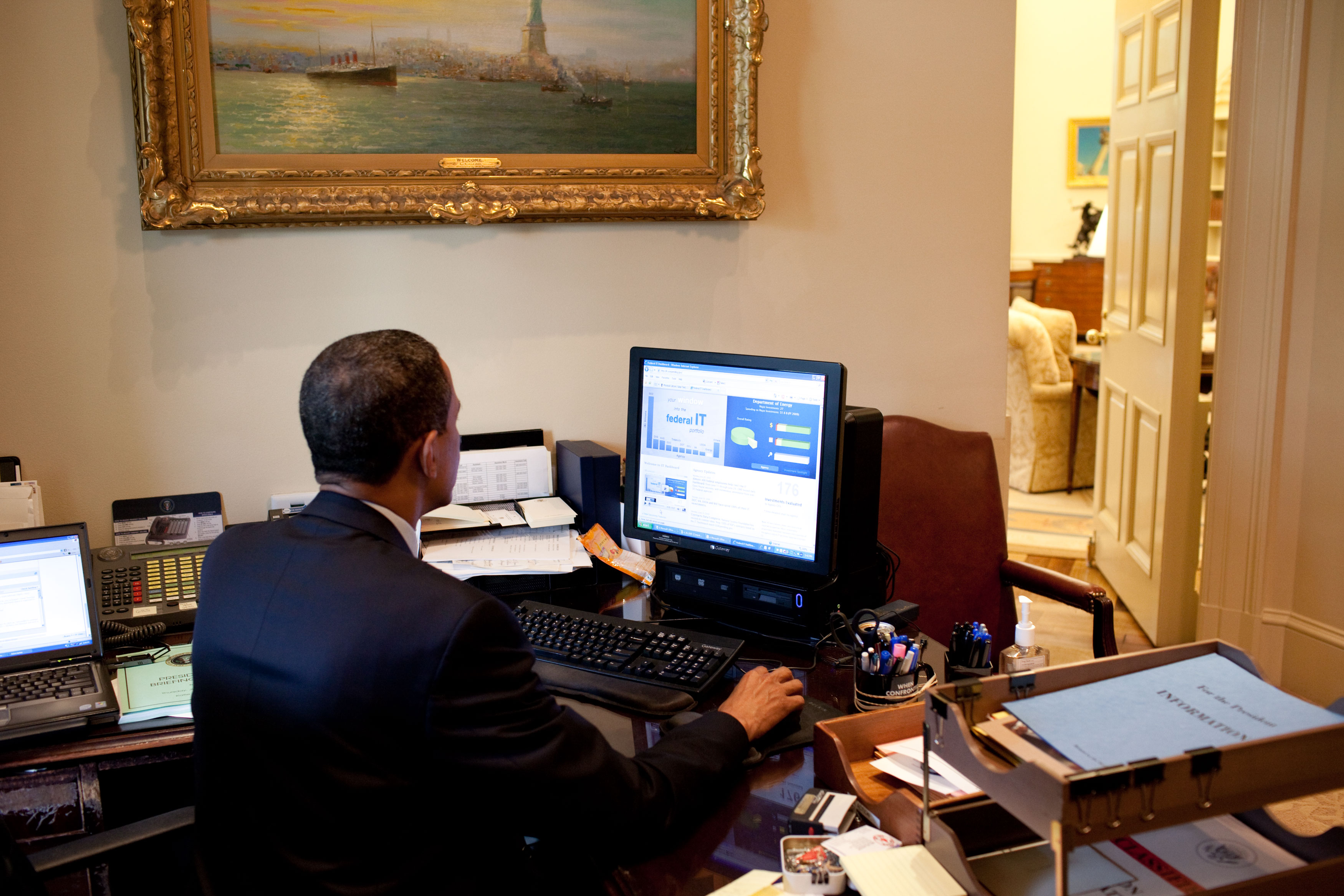
President of the United States Barack Obama using FusionCharts on the Federal IT Dashboard.

The idea behind FusionCharts was born in 2001 when 16-year-old Pallav Nadhani found himself dissatisfied with Microsoft Excel's charting capabilities while using the program to complete high school class assignments. Nadhani subsequently authored an article on Wrox Press's ASPToday.com technology website which examined the thesis that Macromedia Flash, then used mainly for web banners and pop-up ad, could be used to build an interactive charting solution for business applications such as dashboards and reports. The article earned him $1,500 and feedback from developers, which together acted as seed money and motivation for establishing the FusionCharts concept.

In 2002 at 17, Nadhani founded Infosoft Global. The initial product had six charts and was built using ActionScript. Nadhani worked alone developing the product, website, documents, sales and marketing and customer support for the first three years. As the company began to take off in 2005, he acquired office space in Bangur, Kolkata and hired 20 employees over the following 2–3 years. The venture grew during this period without raising external funding by bootstrapping.

By 2009, the company had moved to Salt Lake City, Kolkata, and had grown to over 50 employees. Since moving to Salt Lake, the staff has expanded significantly, and in 2011 FusionCharts opened their second office in Bangalore. FusionCharts serves customers across multiple countries and business sectors.

Co-founder Pallav Nadhani is the CEO of FusionCharts and also runs a seed funding venture capital fund named Seeders Inc.

In March 2020, the company was acquired by Idera, Inc., a U.S.-based software company.

== Products ==
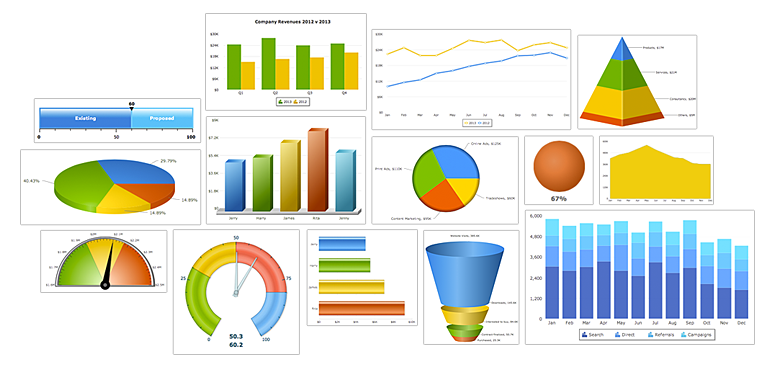
90+ Interactive Charts and 960+ Maps

Pallav Nadhani's original ASPToday.com article called for creating a charting library using Flash, combined with ASP to power it with data. Developers responded positively and shared ideas on how to increase its power and functionality. Subsequently, Pallav coded this idea into a charting application, which led to the birth of the FusionCharts software.

FusionCharts has since transitioned to use JavaScript, SVG and VML to render charts, widgets and maps. FusionCharts components are compatible with multiple mobile devices and web browsers with optional rendering using Flash. FusionCharts Suite XT can today be used with various web scripting languages to create interactive charts.

FusionCharts Suite XT supports XML and JSON data formats and uses HTML5 technologies to create interactive charts.

=== FusionCharts Suite XT ===
FusionCharts Suite XT
- Developer: Pallav Nadhani
- Initial release: 2002
- Stable release: 3.5.1 / 3 December 2014
- Written in: JavaScript, jQuery, SVG, VML & ActionScript
- Size: 553 KB
- Type: JavaScript library
- License: commercial
- Website: www.fusioncharts.com/tour/

=== Book ===
British book publisher Packt Publishing has released a guidebook aimed at helping new users learn the basics of the FusionCharts Suite XT.

== Achievements ==
In 2009, the company was included in the NASSCOM EMERGE 50 Leaders for 2009 due to its success in establishing its data visualization software globally. In the same year it was also awarded the Deloitte Technology Fast50 India award in 2009.

The chart-gadget within Google Docs is powered by FusionCharts. Internally, Google employees also employ FusionCharts software for reporting. FusionCharts says that it powers numerous charts every month globally.

== See also ==
- JavaScript framework
- JavaScript library
