= Victory Canteen =

- Page from the Ivar Theatre program
- Music: Richard M. Sherman; Robert B. Sherman
- Lyrics: Richard M. Sherman; Robert B. Sherman
- Book: Milt Larsen; Bobby Lauher
- Productions: 1971 Los Angeles

Victory Canteen is a musical with book by Milt Larsen and Bobby Lauher and music and lyrics by Richard M. Sherman and Robert B. Sherman.

== Production ==
The musical opened on January 27, 1971 at the Ivar Theatre (Hollywood, California) and ran for six months, and then transferred to San Diego. The show featured Sherry Alberoni, Patty Andrews, Lorene Yarnell, Beverly Sanders, Stewart Rose, Marsha Kramer, Patty Shayne, and Brian Avery.

Also in the cast was Anson Williams as KNX Radio Entertainment Reporter Tom Hatten. The follow-spot operator was KFWB Traffic Reporter Doug Dunlap.

== Overview ==
The show is a happy-go-lucky revue of 1940s style music written by the Sherman Brothers. It was the set up for 1974's Broadway show Over Here! which also featured Patty Andrews as well as a song score by the Shermans. None of the songs from Victory Canteen were used in Over Here!, but Victory did have a musical salute to WW I (the song "Lafayette, We're Here").

== Songs ==
- Victory Canteen
- Happy Tomorrows
- Loose Lips (Sink Ships)
- Va-Va-Va-Veee (For Victory)
- Axe The Axis Polka
- My Window Full Of Stars
- Doughnuts
- L-O-V-E (They Just Can't Ration)
- Hawks!
- Let's Go Native
- South Sea Island Rhapsody
- Lafayette, We're Here
- We Two (Someday)
- Smoke 'Em Up, Smoke 'Em Up, Smoke 'Em Up!
