= NotesPeek =

NotesPeek is a utility written by Ned Batchelder that allows navigation and display of the complete contents of Lotus Notes database files.

NotesPeek displays database components in a tree structure while also providing access to both low level and high level database components. It can show data and settings that otherwise cannot accessed.
