= Magic Castle =

Venue in Los Angeles, California

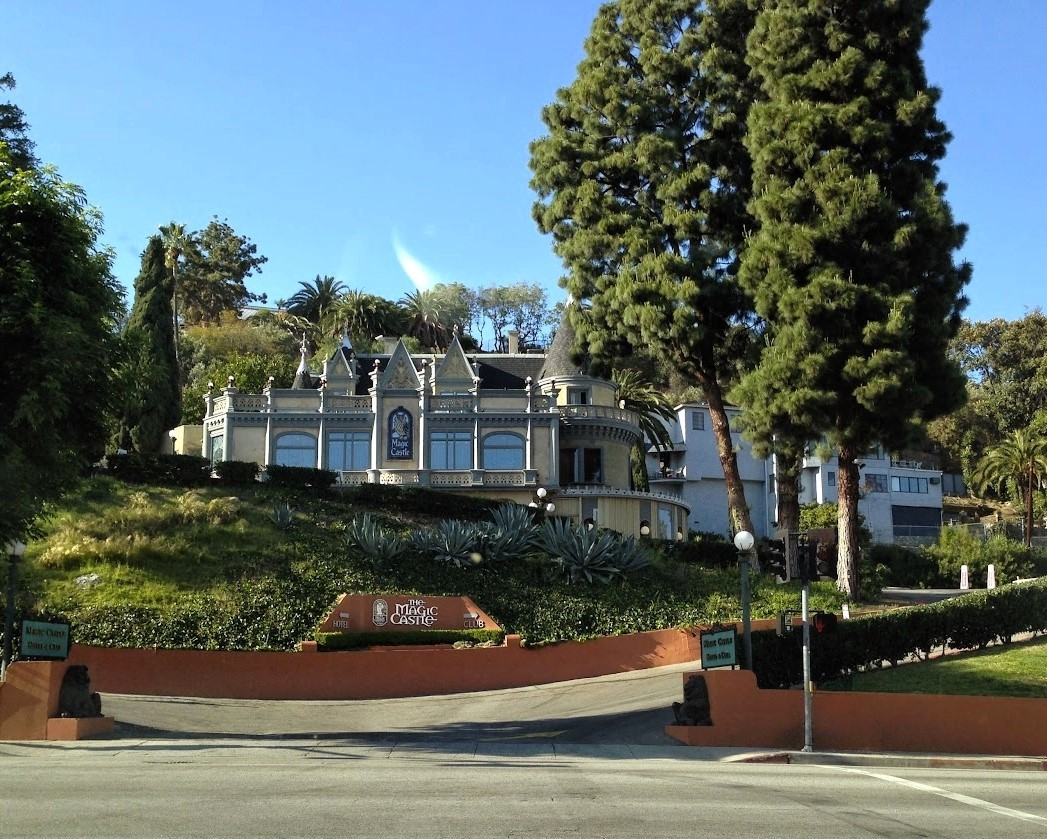

- Location within the Los Angeles metropolitan area Location within California Location within the United States
- 34°6′17″N 118°20′31″W
- Location: 7001 Franklin Avenue, Hollywood, California, United States

History
- Built: 1909

Site notes
- Architect(s): Lyman Farwell; Oliver Perry Dennis
- Architectural style: Chateauesque
- Owner: Kristy and Randy Pitchford
- Website: magiccastle.com

Los Angeles Historic-Cultural Monument
- Designated: 1989
- Reference no.: 406

The Magic Castle is a performance venue, restaurant, and clubhouse for the Academy of Magical Arts for magicians and magic enthusiasts in the Hollywood district of Los Angeles, California, United States. The Academy was started in 1952 by William Larsen Sr., who founded Genii magazine in 1936. The Castle was opened on January 2, 1963 by brothers Bill and Milt Larsen, sons of William Sr and Bill's wife Irene Larsen. Once a private residence, the Castle was declared a Los Angeles Historic-Cultural Monument in 1989.

The Castle was purchased in April 2022 by Randy Pitchford, a grandnephew of British magician Richard Valentine Pitchford. Erika Larsen, daughter of Bill Jr., runs the property with the academy as a tenant.

== History ==
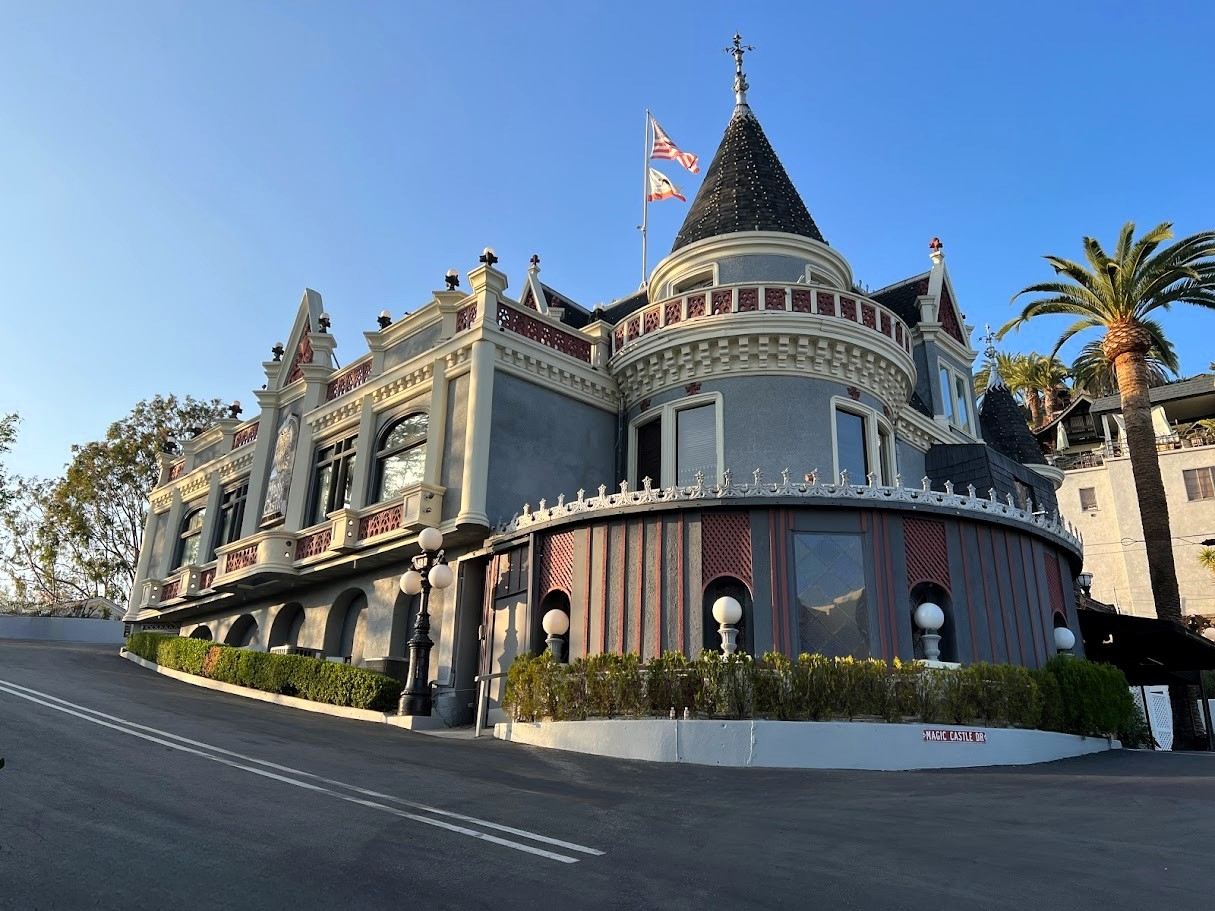

The Magic Castle is a châteauesque residence built in 1909 by Rollin B. Lane, a real estate investor, lawyer, banker, newspaper editor, and philanthropist. The house was designed by architects Lyman Farwell and Oliver Perry Dennis and constructed as a near mirror duplicate of the 1897 Kimberly Crest House and Gardens in Redlands, California, that the architects had designed over a decade earlier. The Lanes called their home "Holly Chateau". Rollin's wife Katherine worked on various civic volunteer communities for the betterment of Hollywood. She was college educated and an author. Originally the house included "seventeen rooms including a roof garden and sun parlor".

Ownership of the building remained in the Lane family until 1955 when it was sold to Thomas O. Glover.

In September 1961, the building was leased to Milt Larsen, Bill Larsen, and Irene Larsen, who began converting it to its present state. The Magic Castle opened for business on January 2, 1963. Over the years, several additions have been made to the original structure, allowing for the inclusion of several theaters, bars, a library and other meeting spaces. In addition, "Street lamps along the driveway that once ran along Venice's Victoria Pier, cast iron frieze work from the Masonic temple on Wilshire, dining room paneling from Sunset's demolished Norma Talmadge Building, and chandeliers from the first Bullock's department store (in Downtown)" have also been added. The Magic Castle was declared a Los Angeles Historic-Cultural Monument in 1989.

One of the Castle's regulars was sleight of hand magician Dai Vernon (1894–1992), who moved to Los Angeles in 1963 and performed for decades at the Castle. In his retirement he would sit in the bar area entertaining and teaching, and after his death in 1992 at the age of 98, according to biographer Karl Johnson, he was cremated and a box with his ashes was brought back to the Castle.

Many celebrities have performed at the Castle, including Orson Welles, Johnny Carson, Steve Martin, Neil Patrick Harris and actor Jason Alexander.

On October 31, 2011, the Castle was damaged in a fire that originated in the attic. Interior refurbishing was necessary as a result of water damage and the Magic Castle reopened in February 2012.

On February 24, 2017 magician Daryl committed suicide by hanging in a dressing room in the magic castle.

In April 2022 the Castle was purchased by Randy Pitchford, the CEO of the Gearbox Entertainment Company from the Glover family. Under his ownership, it will remain a magic performance venue and the Academy's clubhouse. A lifelong magician and grandnephew of British magician Cardini, Pitchford credits his career in entertainment to the Magic Castle. Magicians Penn Jillette and David Copperfield supported the sale to Pitchford (who married his wife Kristy on stage at the Castle). According to Jillette, "'Randy is a very special person as far as the castle is concerned ... he has the means and attitude to preserve its legacy.'"

On April 7, 2026, the Los Angeles Fire Department responded to a fire near the building's roof.

== Description ==
The lobby of the Castle has no visible doors to the interior, and visitors must say a secret phrase to a sculpture of an owl to gain access, exposing the entrance to the club. Five magic performances are showcased each night, spread across three theaters: the Close-up Gallery, the Parlour of Prestidigitation, and a large stage in the Palace of Mystery. On weekends additional performances are added in the Peller Theatre as well as Hat and Hare Pub and W.C. Fields Bar. Informal performance areas near the five bars give magician members the space for impromptu magic for guests and other patrons. In the music room, a piano is played by invisible "Irma", the Castle's "resident ghost," who takes musical requests. In addition, there are regular Houdini séances at the castle in the Houdini Séance room.

A members-only library located in the lower part of the Castle has an extensive collection of books, videos, and memorabilia, including first-edition books on magic in English dating back to 1584, and original magic effects used to design the apparitions in the Haunted Mansion at Disneyland.

Those under 21 years of age are not permitted during evening performances. However, on Saturdays and Sundays, the Castle hosts an "all-ages" brunch and performances which are open to members and their guests, including those under the age of 21. During brunch, the Castle's "Junior Members" (ranging in age from 13 to 20 years old) perform in the Close-up Gallery.

== Academy of Magical Arts ==
Academy of Magical Arts
- Formation: 1962; 64 years ago
- Founder: William Larsen, Sr.
- Type: Non-profit
- Headquarters: The Magic Castle in Hollywood, California
- Members: ~4,800
- President: Mark Wooster
- Website: magiccastle.com

The Academy of Magical Arts is a mutual-benefit nonprofit corporation organized and devoted to the promotion and development of the art of magic.

The Academy of Magical Arts was started in 1952 by William Larsen, Sr. as a loose association of magicians, although it was not officially incorporated and its organization formalized until 1962, when Larsen's sons, Bill Jr. and Milt Larsen, built the Academy into an international organization. The Magic Castle has served as the headquarters for the Academy since 1963.

=== History ===
The Academy of Magical Arts was created by William Larsen Sr. and announced in the April 1952 issue of his independent magazine of magic, Genii; of which all the subscribers were automatically accorded membership.

"Academy Awards" were presented by Larsen over the next several months for outstanding contributions in various areas of the magic arts. William Larsen, Sr. died at the age of 48 in July 1953. His wife Geraldine and his eldest son, Bill Jr. continued the publication of the magazine, but the "Academy" lacked any formal structure, and the organization became dormant. In 1962, William Larsen's younger son, Milt, undertook the job of leasing and restoring an ornately styled, 3-story 1909 house in Hollywood, California and turning it into a meeting place for magicians which he called the "Magic Castle". As part of their plan to revive the Academy and locate it in the "Magic Castle", Bill Jr. filed articles of incorporation and created a nonprofit corporation, in 1962. The Magic Castle opened its doors on January 2, 1963 as the home of the Academy of Magical Arts, Inc.

=== Membership ===
From an initial membership of 50, the Academy grew to a membership of 5,000 in 2006. In 2019-2021 COVID-19 closures forced economic emergencies on the Castle. The "'building purchase fund ultimately turned out to be the pandemic survival fund,'" according to President of the Academy, Chuck Martinez. Hervé Lévy was hired as general manager and chief operation officer in 2021. In order to remain solvent, Lévy raised initiation fees and dues. By May 2022 Lévy reported there were about 4,000 magician members in the academy. According to the Los Angeles Times the April 2022 purchase of the Castle by businessman Randy Pitchford "is expected to alleviate financial pressure felt by the academy".

To become a regular member, one must first be actively practicing or involved with magic as a career or hobby and audition before the academy's membership reviewing committee. Associate members are people who love magic and the academy. Associate member applications must be approved by the board of directors. Honorary and VIP memberships are presented by the board of directors to magicians, celebrities and individual members of the academy who have contributed to the advancement of the art of magic.

Membership in the Junior Society is open to anyone seriously interested in magic who is from 13 to 19 years of age. Applications and an audition are required, according to Chair Steven Barnes, it is a "'highly competitive program and it's incredibly rare to get accepted on your first try. ... It's not a beginning program. And it's not a school,” he said. 'We like to think of ourselves as the Juilliard of magic.'” Many of whom have gone on to professional careers in magic including, Mark Kalin, Kevin James and Christopher Hart. The Society started in 1974 by Cary Grant and magician Diana Zimmerman who said that she has seen more girls audition but more are wanted. Since 2021, approximately 3,000 have "come through the Junior Society".

=== Past presidents ===
- Bill Larsen Jr.
- Ron Wilson
- Mark Wilson
- Gay Blackstone
- Neil Patrick Harris
- Jim Steinmeyer

== LA Times investigation ==
According to coverage by the Los Angeles Times, the academy was sued four times, from 2011 to 2019, by former employees "alleging violations of the Fair Employment and Housing Act, which protects against sexual harassment, discrimination and retaliation. Settlements of undisclosed terms were reached in three of the cases," and the fourth case by a discharged waitstaff was not settled at the time of the LA Times' reporting in December 2020. General manager Joseph Furlow resigned two weeks after the LA Times investigation of "allegations of sexual misconduct, racism and other issues" in December 2020. Furlow had worked for the academy since 2012. The academy's board released a statement that a law firm had conducted a months-long investigation, and that "the findings were serious and broad-spanning, covering management, culture, human resources, operational systems and processes, and the need for systemic change." The president of the board, Randy Sinnott Jr., said that the academy was "implementing ... recommendations from the law firm's investigation" and that "all claims brought to the attention of the Board or management are treated seriously and professionally." Furlow stated that he is "confident that the facts will reveal themselves moving forward" and that "any concerns ... were thoroughly investigated ... [he] was cleared of any wrongdoing."

Member Chris Hannibal quoted in the Times investigation in 2020 stated that he has witnessed women being treated as "prey or props" and also commented on the interior architecture of the ground-floor bar, in which it was "an open secret" that because of the steep angle when women wearing dresses ascended the main staircase "it [was] easy to 'fully see straight up a dress.'" Prior to the Castle re-opening post pandemic in 2021, changes were made to the railing which obscured the view from below.

Other complaints were that the board of directors and board of trustees were majority male, eleven of the thirteen members between the two groups. Magician member Kayla Drescher in her own investigation of female vs male bookings showed the Times statistics from 2016-2018 only seven percent of booked magicians were female, and that desired rooms and prime time slots were rarely given to women. Allegations of racism also were given to the Times by former employees and magician members. The board of directors responded: "We admit our own past shortcomings in this area. We will work steadfastly for a more diverse and inclusive club in our membership, our performers, our staff, and our outreach." Erika Larsen, daughter of founder Bill Larsen, said that they are "deeply saddened ... The Academy of Magical Arts, and its clubhouse the Magic Castle, were built on a foundation of love for the art of magic and love of community. The Larsens do not condone discrimination on the basis of race or gender, sexual harassment or any form of abuse and intimidation."

A March 2022 election for the board expanded the number of board members from seven to nine and was led by Chuck Martinez, who has been an academy member forty years. Martinez told the Times that there were problems at the Castle that he had "taken to heart" and that "the new board has four women on it, three of whom are officers, [and] it has two gentlemen of color. It really shows a lot of openness to turn the page and create a whole new era for the Castle."

Magician Paul Draper told the Times that when he ran for the board he had "advocated for training on diversity and inclusion" and looks forward to the Magic Castle catching up to the rest of the magic world who are embracing change. The board of trustees added more depictions of female and Black magicians to the Castle decor, but controversy over artwork of magician William Ellsworth Robinson's use of yellowface and copying the act of Chinese magician Ching Ling Foo have left members divided over the correct action to take. A sign acknowledging the "ethical concerns" was added but members question the decision to continue to display any of Robinson's images.

== Awards ==
Performing awards are given in different categories at the annual "Academy of the Magical Arts Awards" event. Nominees for the performing awards are chosen from among that year's performers at The Magic Castle.

Other awards include various Fellowship, Merit, and Achievement awards which go to individuals who, in the view of the Academy, have made significant contributions to the field of magic.

These are the awards given by the Academy of Magical Arts:

- Magician of the Year (1968–present)
- Stage Magician of the Year (1968–present)
- Close-Up Magician of the Year (1968–present)
- Lecturer of the Year (1968–present)
- Visiting Magician of the Year (1969–present)
- Parlour Magician of the Year (1983–present)
- Comedy Magician of the Year (2003–2006)
- Bar Magician of the Year (2004–2005)
- Masters Fellowship (1968–present)
- Performing Fellowship (1968–present)
- Creative Fellowship (1968–present)
- Literary & Media Fellowship (1968–present)
- Special Fellowship (1968–present)
- Lifetime Achievement Fellowship (1985–present)
- Award of Merit (1968–present)
- Junior Achievement Award (1976–present)

Additionally, there are some other awards that have been given once or very infrequently. These include the Junior Award of Merit and Honorary Life Membership.

One of the five winners of the 1974 Award of Merit is The Magic Castle itself.

== In popular culture ==
- 2021 - In season 6, episode 1 of the Lucifer TV series, Lucifer and Chloe visit the Magic Castle for their last planned night on earth.
- 2016 - Scenes from the Netflix series Love episode, "Magic" were filmed and take place at the Magic Castle, the series "poked fun at the self-serious nature of performance magic and the venue's strict dress code".

== See also ==
- Los Angeles Historic–Cultural Monuments in Hollywood
- Hollywood Heights, Los Angeles
- The Magic Circle (organisation) in London.
