= WhereScape =

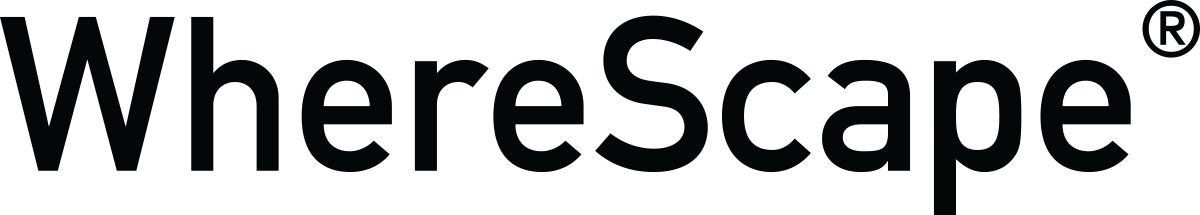
- Type: Private
- Industry: Computer Software; Data Warehouse Automation; Data Management; Cloud Migration
- Headquarters: Houston, Texas, USA
- Products: WhereScape RED, WhereScape 3D, Data Vault Express
- Owner: Idera Software
- Number of employees: 100
- Website: www.wherescape.com

WhereScape is a privately held international data warehouse automation and big data software company. WhereScape was acquired in 2019 by Idera Software.

== History ==
The company was formerly named Profit Management Systems, but officially renamed to WhereScape in 2001 when expanding business operations into the USA. WhereScape was founded as a data warehouse consulting company in Auckland, New Zealand in 2002 by co-founders Michael Whitehead (President) and Wayne Richmond.

WhereScape operates out of regional headquarters in Houston, Texas, USA; Reading, United Kingdom; and Singapore. As of 2015, it had over 720 customers in more than 15 countries and revenue of around $20 million (NZD). Sales channels vary by country but can be either direct sales or through local partners. WhereScape also has partnerships with third-party companies that embed WhereScape software in their solutions. WhereScape was acquired in 2019 by Idera Software.

In 2020 the company was selected as a finalist for the Specialist Vendor of the Year award 2020.

== WhereScape Products ==
WhereScape currently offers three main products: WhereScape RED, WhereScape 3D, and Data Vault Express

As of November 2017, version numbers between the two have been aligned and the current stable version is 8.0.1.0.
