= Metalogix =

American software vendor

Metalogix Software
- Type: Private
- Industry: Computer software
- Founded: 2001; 25 years ago
- Headquarters: Aliso Viejo, California, U.S.
- Parent: Quest Software
- Website: www.quest.com/metalogix/

Metalogix Software is an independent software vendor, founded in 2001 in Vancouver, British Columbia by Julien Sellgren, Geordie Henderson and Rasool Rayani and was acquired by Quest Software, Inc. in July 2018. Metalogix develops, sells, and provides support for content infrastructure software for Microsoft SharePoint, Microsoft Exchange and Microsoft Office 365 platforms.

Metalogix sells an array of products for managing content infrastructure. The company's primary product is Content Matrix, which migrates content between SharePoint versions. Metalogix is part of Quest Software, Inc. having been acquired in July 2018.

== See also ==
Axceler, a company acquired by Metalogix in 2013.
