= Dwa (stool) =

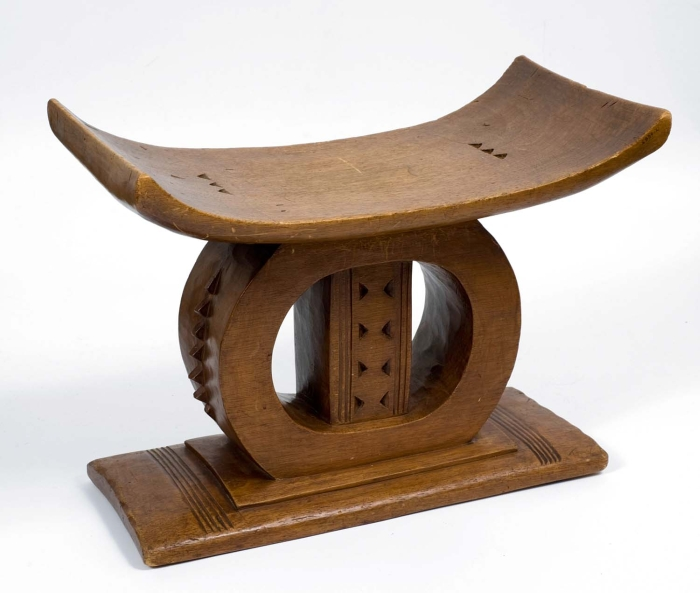
A dwa stool

A dwa or asesedwa or sometimes gwa is a stool of the Ashantis of Ghana.

== Uses ==
Often made of wood, the dwa is more or less decorated according to the status of its possessor, it has great institutional and symbolic importance among the Akan. These stools are rectangular in shape and have five supporting pillars (annan). The royal seat or ahennwa is considered the "soul of the nation", once enthroned the king (ahene) becomes as sacred as the seat.

The mmarima dwa are the stools of the men, while the mmaa dwa are for women. The adammadwa (literally "two pennies stool") are for poor people.

== Gallery ==
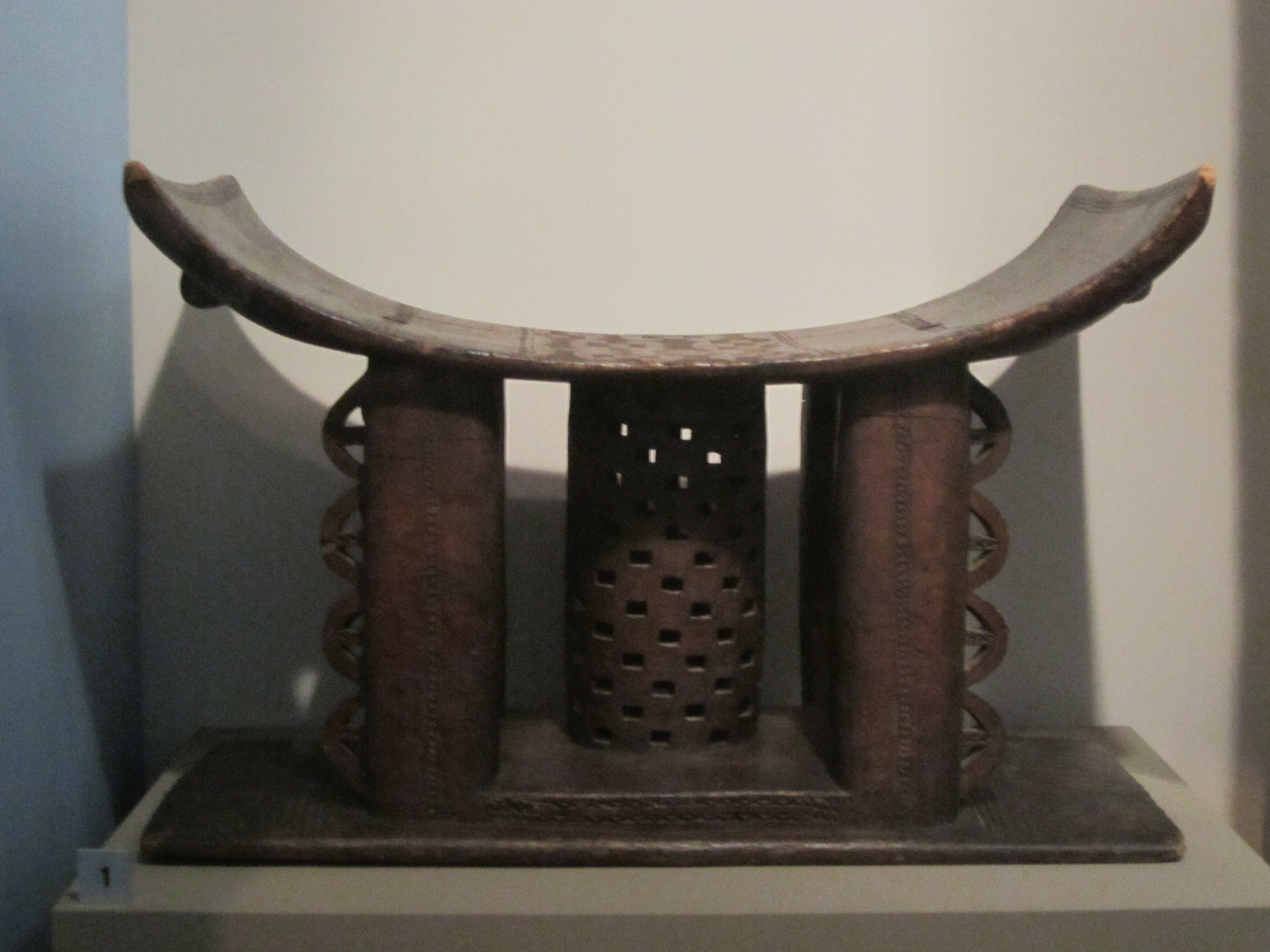

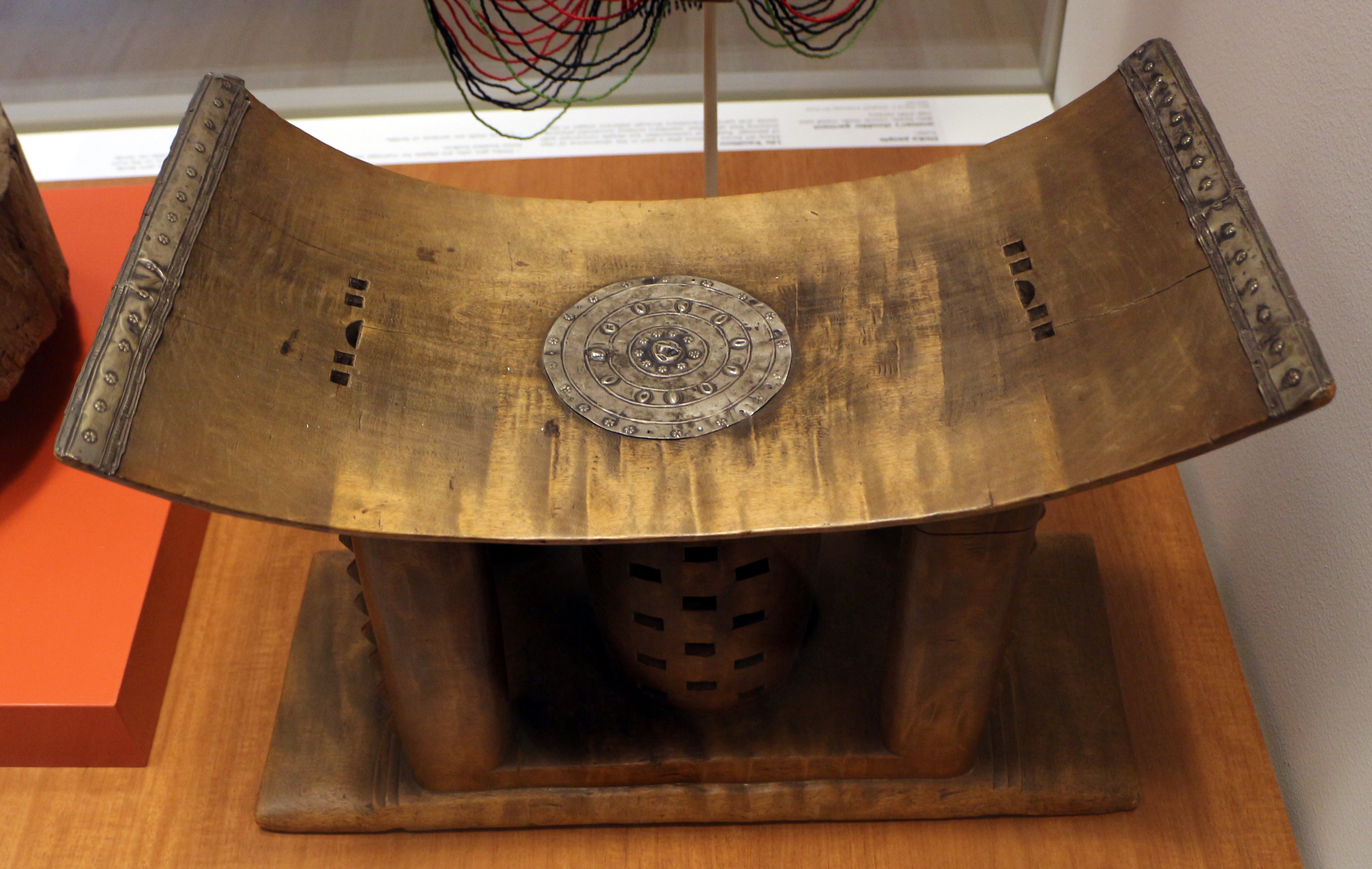

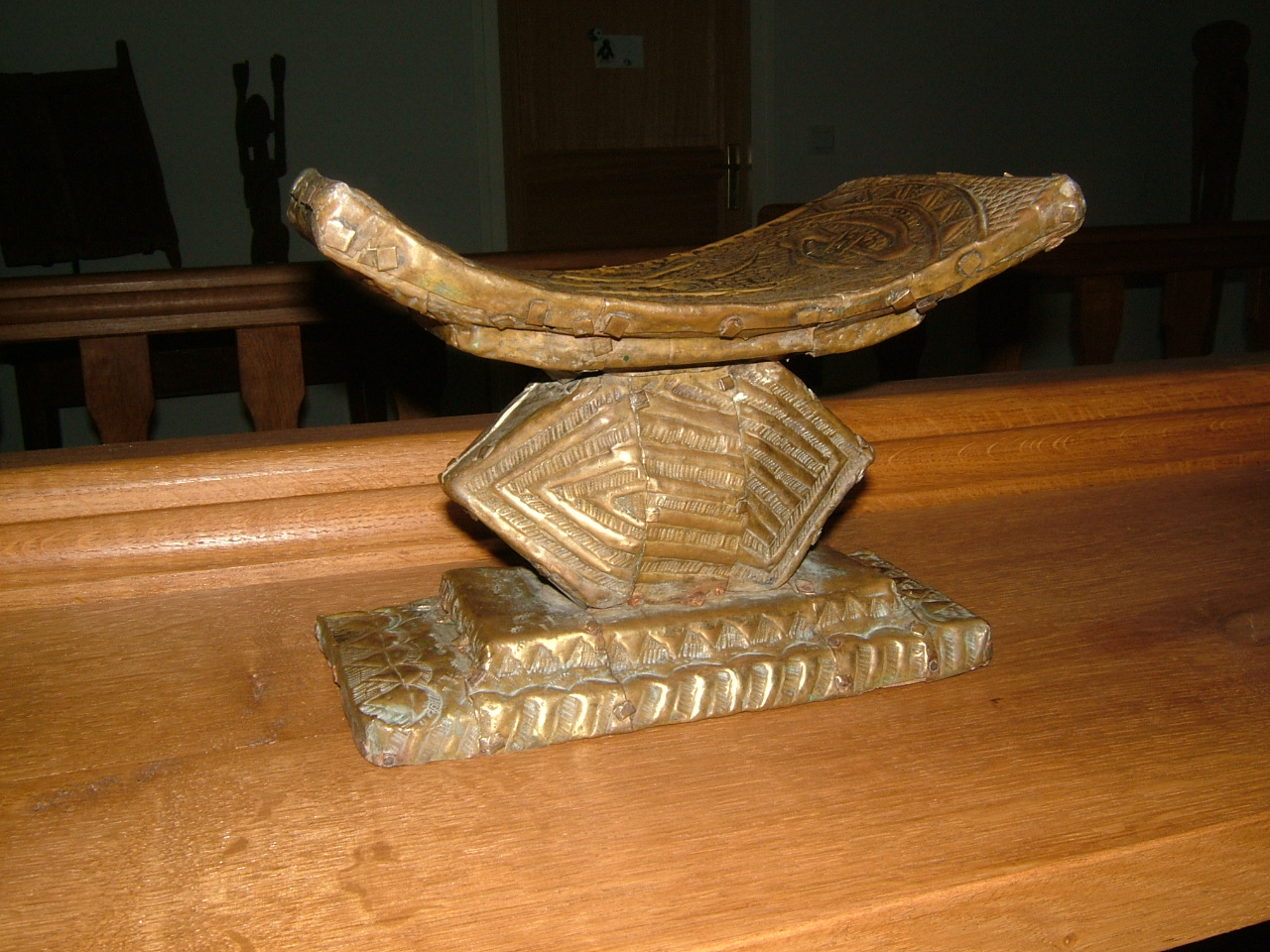
Small ashanti stool, copper on wooden frame

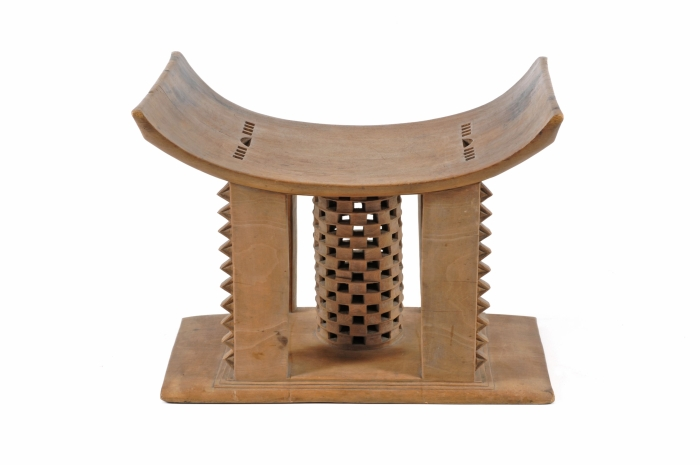

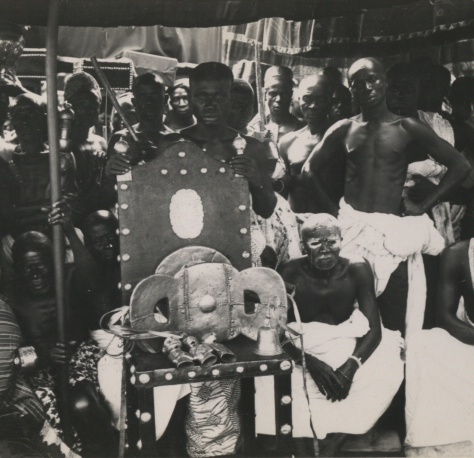
The Golden stool 1935

== Bibliography ==
- Christiane Falgayrettes-Leveau, Christiane Owusu-Sarpong, Ghana hier et aujourd'hui, éditions Dapper, 2003.
- Sandro Bocola, Ezio Bassani, African Seats, Vitra Design Museum, 1995.
- Mougo Boniface, Azariah Nyaggah, Social Origins of the Asante Traditional Administrators, 1974.
