= Traditional Ghanaian stool =

Symbol of royalty and custom in West Africa

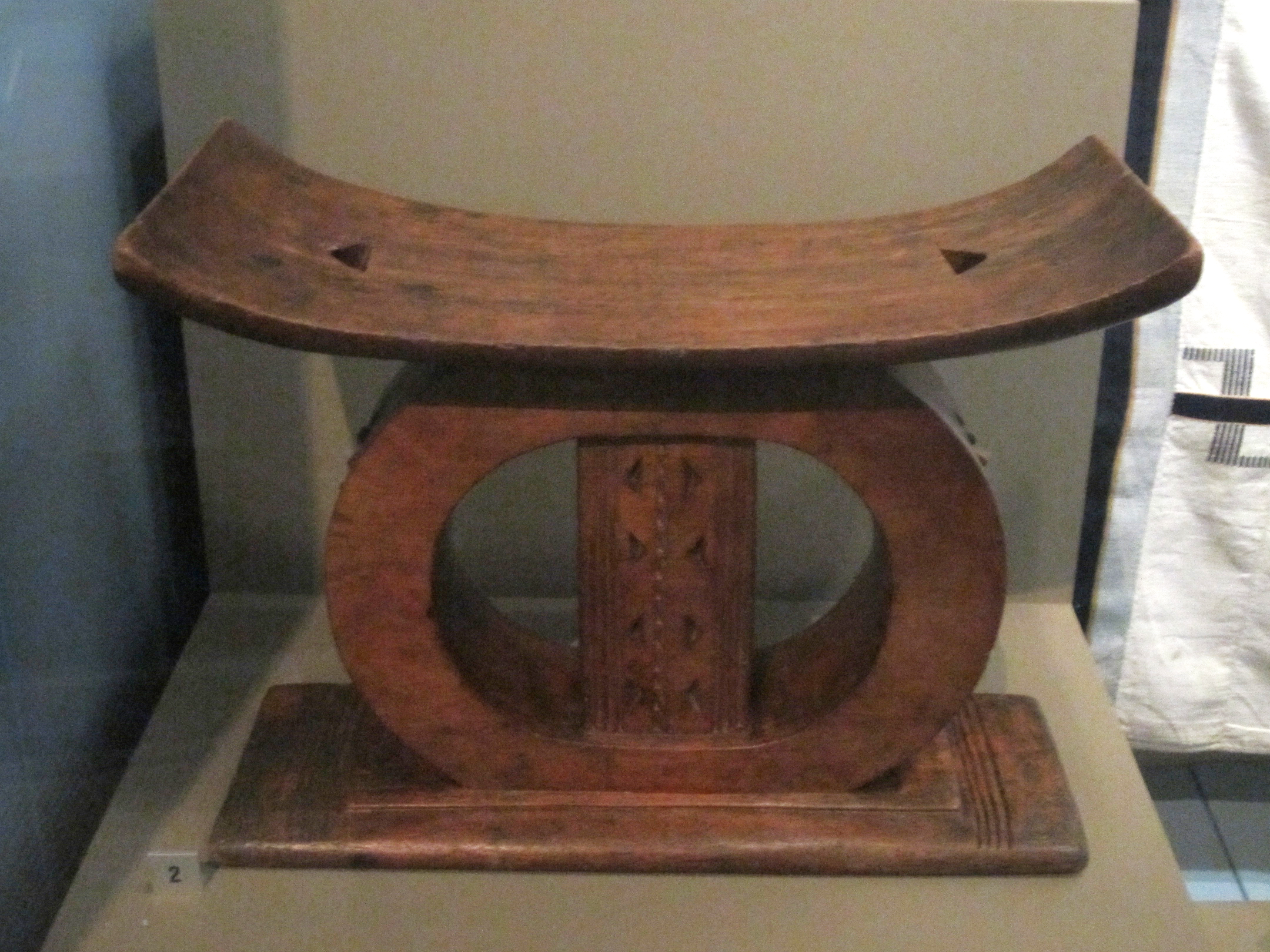
A picture of the Ghanaian traditional stool also known as Asesedwa

The traditional Ghanaian stool (or asesedwa in the Asante Twi language) is a carved wooden stool common in sub-Saharan West Africa, and especially common in Ghana. Among the Akan it is used as a household object, it is used in rites of passage, and is considered sacred.

The stool is used as a symbol of chieftaincy (particularly male) in special and private occasions, and is seen as a symbol of royalty, custom and tradition. Queen mothers may be seen in public sitting on the traditional stool as a seat of authority, communicating messages about the nature of leadership. The asesedwa is believed to have religious importance. It is carved into different sizes, shape and design to communicate a specific message of authority. It is important in the Akan tradition because it highlights the sense of community, social and political life, tradition and serving as a symbol of unity and solidarity, believed to bind the souls of their kinsmen together in both the physical and metaphysical worlds. The stool has a great influence on when a leader assumes office and hence a popular term "enstoolment" is used. In Akan, the stool of a leader is so integrally connected to his personality that the expression "a stool has fallen" defines his death. The Golden Stool of the Ashantis is a traditional stool called Sika Dwa which is believed to have a metaphysical origin. The Mampongs have the traditional silver stool.

== Crafting ==
The conventional stool (asesedwa) is made from the sese wood that gives it the whitish appearance. Other trees such as Bodaa can be used to carve the traditional stool.

- Cut down the specific tree
- cut the trees into logs
- dry the log for about two weeks
- The stool is carved requiring skill and creativity for approximately six to twelve months
- No addition of chemicals but are smoked for pest protection

== Appearance and structure ==
The traditional stool has a rectangular base with concentric rings of spider in the middle, a central support that communicates the message with figural representations as a symbolism of the stool and a carved seat on the central support where the person of authority sits on.
