= HCL iNotes =

HCL iNotes (formerly IBM Lotus iNotes and IBM iNotes) offers a full-featured web-based version of HCL Technologies's HCL Notes client. Formerly known as IBM Lotus Domino Web Access, HCL iNotes provides HCL Notes users with browser-based access to their HCL Notes mail, calendar, and contacts. The software combines with HCL Domino software to provide a client interface that is available both online and offline. It provides access to collaboration tools using a variety of web browsers across multiple platforms.

HCL iNotes comes as a feature in HCL Domino. The administrator can turn this feature on to allow access to emails via browser. Domino administrators can maintain and control a standard and consistent experience for users through centralized Lotus Domino administrative policies that set or enforce mail settings for Lotus iNotes users. In addition, Lotus iNotes has full offline support via Domino Off-Line Services (DOLS), integrated instant messaging.

Lotus iNotes includes three modes for users accessing their Notes mail:

- Full Mode – Provides integrated collaboration tools for environments that provide full broadband connections. For users that need full access to all of the iNotes features.
- Lite mode – This mode includes mail, contacts, and calendar and is best suited for slow connections or bandwidth constrained networks. For users that need to access mail in a public place, such as at a kiosk.
- Ultra-light mode – This mode is available either on a mobile device (initially available on the Apple iPhone or iPod Touch using Apple Safari), or on your desktop (using Mozilla Firefox) as the accessible mode of iNotes.

== Functionality ==
HCL iNotes allows users of HCL Notes to access their Domino-based mail, calendar, schedule, to-do list, contacts, and notebook (Notes Journal) from any computer which has a certified web-browser and an Internet connection. It uses dynamic HTML and Ajax to minimize the number of full-page refreshes and transactions interacting with the Domino web server.

iNotes also integrates with the HCL Sametime instant-messaging software and offers offline support through IBM Lotus Domino Off-Line Services (DOLS).

== History ==
- A client called "Lotus Notes Webmail" provided limited web access to web-enabled Lotus Notes email systems (versions 4 and 5) from the late 1990s.
- Lotus Software referred to iNotes as "Shimmer" in its beta version.
- Release 5.0.8 (2001) of Lotus Notes introduced iNotes, which featured a fuller interface than the Webmail client. That year, Network Computing magazine gave a "Well-Connected Award" to iNotes for "Best Web-based Application".
- Release 6.5 of Lotus Domino (September 2003) renamed iNotes to Domino Web Access.
- Release 7.0.2 of Lotus Domino (September 2006) introduced support for the Macintosh.
- Release 7.0.3 of Lotus Domino (October 2007)
- Release 8.5 of Lotus Domino (January 2009) renamed Domino Web Access back to iNotes.
- Release 9.0 of IBM iNotes made significant changes to capabilities and supported browsers. For more details, see IBM Product Documentation, specifically What's New in IBM iNotes 9.0 Social Edition

== See also ==
- HCL Notes
- IBM Notes Traveler
- HCL Domino
- Outlook Web App
