= Froala =

Commercial JavaScript WYSIWYG rich text editor

- Original authors: Diana Neculai; Ștefan Neculai
- Developers: Idera, Inc.
- Release: 2014
- Written in: JavaScript
- Operating system: Cross-platform
- Platform: Web
- Type: Rich text editor
- License: Proprietary
- Website: froala.com

Froala is a JavaScript WYSIWYG rich text editor used to embed document-style editing inside web applications.

== Overview ==
Froala originated in Romania and the company behind it was founded by software developers Diana Neculai and Ștefan Neculai. It was acquired in 2018 by Idera, Inc., a U.S.-based software holding company headquartered in Houston.

Froala Editor is implemented in JavaScript and is intended to be embedded into web applications to provide in-browser, document-style editing. It is a lightweight component with a developer-oriented API and supports integration through script includes or framework plugins.

== History ==
Froala’s founders began working on the editor while building a website builder, and the editor component became the primary product. The editor was publicly launched in January 2014, initially operating out of Bucharest.

On 19 June 2018, Idera, Inc. announced the acquisition of Froala.

== See also ==
- CKEditor
- TinyMCE
