= Data warehouse automation =

Data warehouse automation (DWA) refers to the process of accelerating and automating the data warehouse development cycles, while assuring quality and consistency. DWA is believed to provide automation of the entire lifecycle of a data warehouse, from source system analysis to testing to documentation. It helps improve productivity, reduce cost, and improve overall quality.

== General ==
Data warehouse automation primarily focuses on automation of each and every step involved in the lifecycle of a data warehouse, thus reducing the efforts required in managing it. Data warehouse automation works on the principles of design patterns. It comprises a central repository of design patterns, which encapsulate architectural standards as well as best practices for data design, data management, data integration, and data usage. In November 2015, an analyst firm has published a guide Which Data Warehouse Automation Tool is Right for You? covering four of the leading products in the DWA space. In November 2015, an international software and technology services company engaged in developing ‘agile tools’ for the data integration industry, was named by CIO Review as one of the 20 most promising productivity tools solution providers 2015.

== Benefits ==
Data warehouse automation can provide advantages like source data exploration, warehouse data models, ETL generation, test automation, metadata management, managed deployment, scheduling, change impact analysis and easier maintenance and modification of the data warehouse. More important than the technical features of data warehouse automation tools, however, is the ability to deliver projects faster and with less resources.

== See also ==
- Data warehouse
- Data mart
- Data warehouse appliance
- Data integration
- WhereScape
