= Milt Larsen =

American businessman (1931–2023)

- Born: April 9, 1931; Pasadena, California, U.S.
- Died: May 28, 2023 (aged 92); Hollywood, California, U.S.
- Occupations: Actor, writer, businessman

Milt Larsen (April 9, 1931 – May 28, 2023) was an American actor, writer, performer, lyricist, magician, businessman, speaker, and the creator of The Magic Castle, a private club for magicians and enthusiasts.

== Early life ==
Larsen and his brother, Bill Larsen Jr., were both in television and grew up in a family of magicians. Their father, William W. Larsen Sr., was a performing magician and Los Angeles defense attorney. Their mother, Geraldine, was an early TV pioneer children's entertainer known as The Magic Lady. In 1936, Larsen's parents began publishing Genii, the Conjurors Magazine, which is still in publication. In 1999, Magic magazine selected the Larsen Family as one of the 100 most influential magicians in the 20th century.

== The Magic Castle ==
The Larsen Brothers' father died in 1953, his dream of a place for magicians to gather and swap trade secrets over drinks unrealized. In 1961 Larsen met Tom Glover, the owner of the hillside property which included the Hollywood restaurant The Yamashiro.

Larsen told Glover about his father's idea of a clubhouse for magicians, and Glover agreed to Milt's proposal to transform the Lane mansion on Glover's property, below The Yamashiro, into The Magic Castle, a nightclub for magicians and home of the Academy of Magical Arts.

Larsen leased the property and restored the French Chateau mansion to house the club. His brother Bill, at the time a CBS television staff producer of The Danny Kaye Show and others, helped promote the club among his network show business connections, recruiting members. When The Magic Castle opened its doors in 1963, Bill came on board as President of the Academy of Magical Arts and Sciences, and was soon joined by Irene Larsen, in the promotions department.

Larsen also created the Mayfair Music Hall in Santa Monica, California (a Victorian British music hall featuring live stage shows) (1973–1980), The Variety Arts Theatre – Los Angeles (1977–1990) and Caesars Magical Empire at Caesars Palace Las Vegas (1995–2004).

== Writing career ==
Larsen was a writer for the classic Ralph Edwards audience participation TV show Truth or Consequences(1956–1977) starring Bob Barker.

Larsen also wrote the Malibu U television series (1967) and audience participation shows starring Vin Scully and Jim Nabors.

Milt Larsen and collaborator Bobby Lauher wrote the book for the stage musical Victory Canteen starring Patty Andrews of the Andrews Sisters fame. Songs were written by prolific songwriters Robert B. Sherman and Richard M. Sherman. (Mary Poppins, Chitty Chitty Bang Bang. It's a Small World After All) (Two Academy Awards – eight nominations)

Richard M. Sherman and Milt Larsen have been friends and collaborators for more than 60 years. They wrote the score for a proposed speakeasy nightclub revue in 1957 (Whoopee Kid); it was later produced as a staged radio show (Charlie Sent Me) with a new book by Sherman, Larsen and Roger Rittner and starred veteran actor Buddy Ebsen. Broadcast on NPR and released on LP by Glendale Record Company.

Richard Sherman and Larsen created a satirical record album which has since made the transition to CD: Smash Flops, featuring tongue-in-cheek songs like "Bon Voyage, Titanic", "General Custer", and features "Congratulations Tom Dewey", which was used for the theme song in the stage production Give 'Em Hell, Harry!, a one-man stage play about United States President Harry S. Truman starring James Whitmore, later made into an Emmy Award nominated TV Movie (1975). They also wrote the comedy classic LP, now a CD, Banned Barbershop Ballads (which includes tunes like "Watch World War Three on Pay TV"). Released new CD Sherman & Larsen's Smash Flops. (Remaster classic songs plus "The Palin for President Polka" and "The Fracking Song.) Magic Castle Records – Hollywood)

Richard Sherman and Larsen wrote words and music for the comedy musical Pazzazz! (book by Larsen and Sherman). The musical had its world premiere as the first major musical at the multi-million dollar restoration of the Granada Center for the Performing Arts in Santa Barbara, California in June 2008. It was produced by Larsen and his wife Arlene. A capsulized version of the musical was presented at Walt Disney's El Capitan Theater in Hollywood (February 2010). The latest full production was presented at the historic Lobero Theatre in Santa Barbara (March 2011).

== Other activities ==
In 1956 Larsen produced his first all-star magic revue "It's Magic!", with a new edition playing West Coast performing arts centers annually. Still enjoying a continuous run, the revue is co-produced by Terry Hill. Various editions of the show play West Coast performing arts centers from Bellingham, Washington, to San Diego. In addition to the 2016 Spring season of the touring show a stellar celebration of the show's 60th years will be held in October at the theatre it all started, the Wilshire Ebell Theater in Los Angeles.

Along with Carol Marie, Milt has penned many books including: Milt Larsen's Magical Mystery Tour of Hollywood's Most Amazing Landmark: The Magic Castle; Hollywood Illusion: The Magic Castle; Hockmann, the Great Exposes Himself! and Other Phony Magicians and Vaudevillians; My Magical Journey – The First 30,000 Days; The 60th Anniversary: It's Magic!.

Larsen served as a creative consultant for the motion picture Bedknobs And Broomsticks (Disney Studios – 1971).

Larsen appeared as an actor on television's Hart To Hart (1981, "Murder Up Their Sleeve"), and had an uncredited cameo appearance as a spectator in Bedknobs And Broomsticks. He appeared as the back and hands of actor Raul Julia as Gomez Addams, performing his tablecloth yank at the end of Gomez and Morticia's Tango dance in Addams Family Values (Paramount Pictures – 1993). His table-cloth pulling gag has been seen in many TV shows and films.

Larsen hosted a weekend radio show on CRN Digital Talk Radio called Hear Them Again for the First Time, featuring rare antique personality recordings from his vast collection of 78 rpm recordings. Another CRN weekend show, "Hit Parade Cavalcade", featured Larsen and Sherman saluting the songwriters of "TinPan Alley."

Larsen was also a well known theater historian and owned many important collections including extensive archives of Ed Wynn, Eddie Cantor, Earl Carroll and others. His collections included books, films, recordings, scripts, orchestrations and sheet music from the early days of the variety theater. He was the founder and President of the Society for the Preservation of Variety Arts, (1975–1990, Los Angeles).

In June 1973, Milt Larsen, Richard Sherman and Roger Rittner presented their new musical. “The Whoopee Kid,” at the Occidental Center Auditorium, Los Angeles.

== Death ==
Larsen died on May 28, 2023, at the age of 92.
