= Rialto Theater (Los Angeles) =

Former movie theater in Los Angeles

- U.S. Historic district – Contributing property
- Los Angeles Historic-Cultural Monument
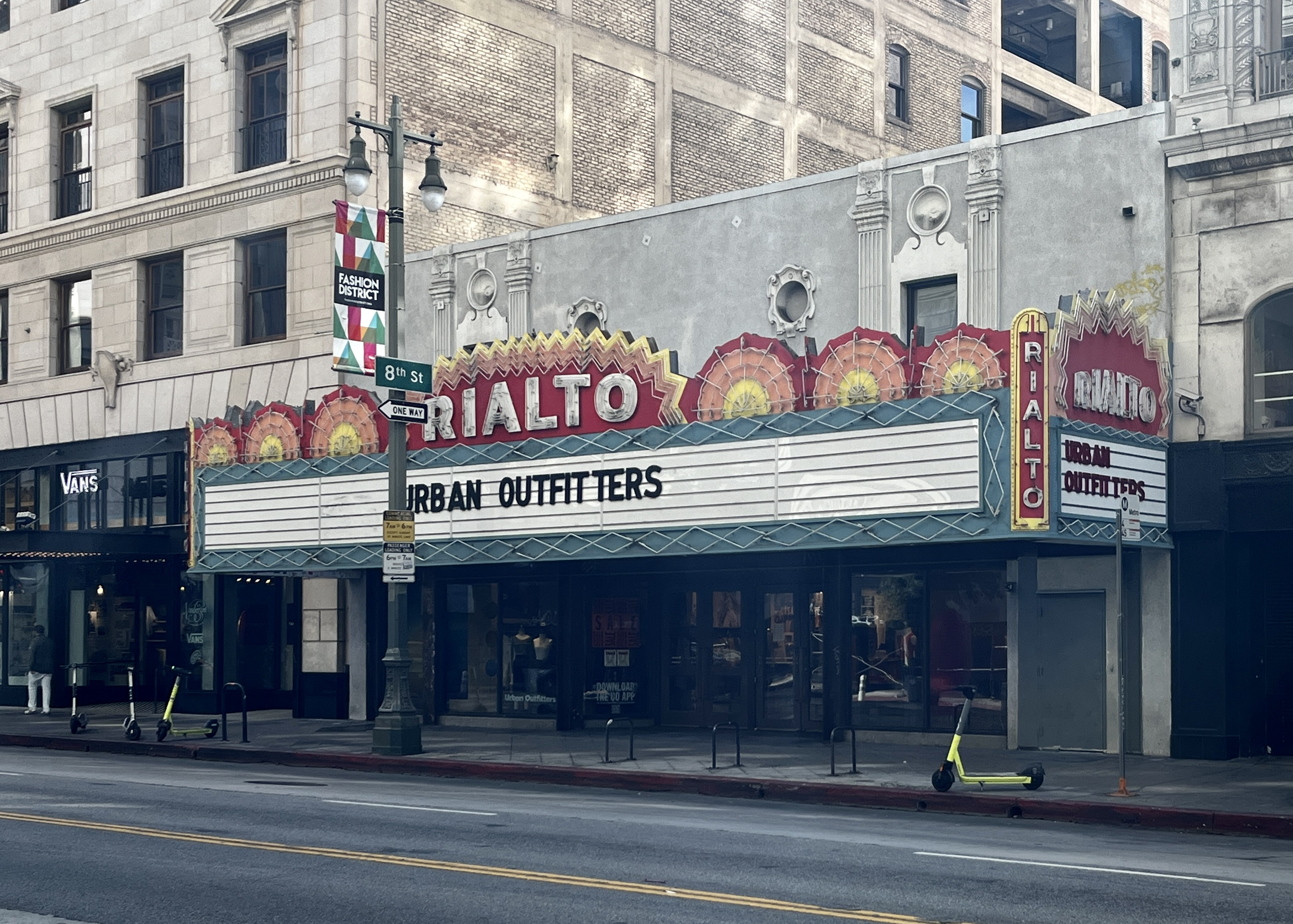
- The building in 2022

- Location within the Los Angeles metropolitan area
- Location: 812 S. Broadway, Los Angeles
- Coordinates: 34.045°N 118.254°W
- Built: 1917
- Architect: Oliver Perry Dennis; William Lee Woollett
- Architectural style: Greek Revival; Georgian Revival; Art Deco
- Part of: Broadway Theater and Commercial District (ID79000484)
- LAHCM No.: 472

Significant dates
- Designated CP: May 9, 1979
- Designated LAHCM: December 20, 1989

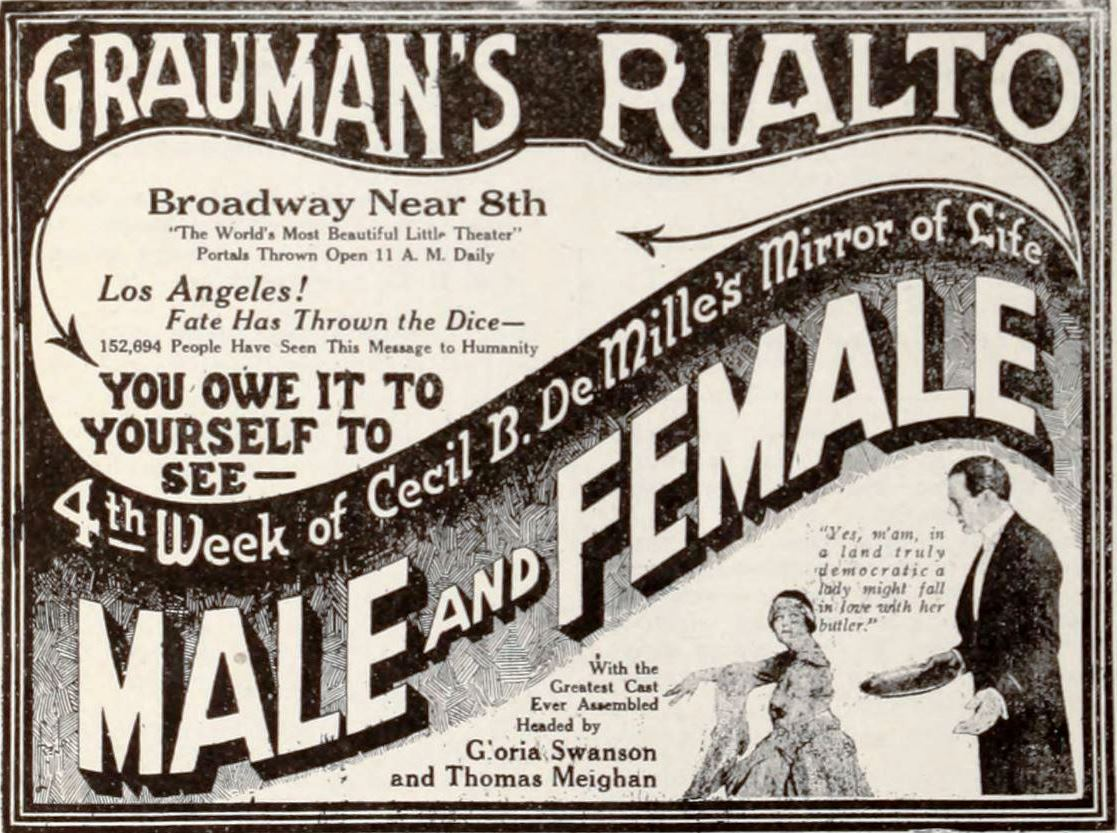
Grauman’s Rialto advertisement for the film Male and Female (1919)

Rialto Theater, formerly Quinn's Rialto Theater and Grauman’s Rialto, is a historic former movie theater located at 812 S. Broadway in the Broadway Theater District in the historic core of downtown Los Angeles.

== History ==
Downtown Los Angeles's Rialto Theater was designed and built in 1917 by Oliver Perry Dennis, the architect also known for Janes House and the Magic Castle. Since opening, the building has undergone many alterations, including a significant remodel by William Lee Woollett in 1923, the addition of neon Art Deco marquee around 1930, a conversion to retail sometime after 1988, and a seismic retrofit in the 1990s.

Exhibitor J.A. Quinn opened the theater in 1917 with an exclusive screening of Garden of Allah. Sid Grauman took over in 1919, and in 1921, the theater entered into an exclusive agreement with Paramount Pictures, whom Grauman sold the theater to in 1924.

In 1979, Los Angeles's Broadway Theater and Commercial District was added to the National Register of Historic Places, with Rialto Theater listed as a contributing property in the district. In 1989, the building was designated Los Angeles Historic-Cultural Monument No. 472.

Rialto Theater closed as a movie theater in 1988. In 2013, Urban Outfitters moved into the building.

== Architecture and design ==
The Rialto Theater originally featured a Greek Revival design that included three sets of arched windows and a pediment atop its facade. A remodel completely changed this design, adding a Georgian façade with two rectangular windows that were flanked by fluted pilasters and small round windows. A second remodel added a neon Art Deco marquee.

Inside, huge columns originally framed the proscenium, the side walls were designed to resemble ancient stonework, and the plaster ceiling beams were painted to resemble wood. Almost none of the original interior remains.

== See also ==
- List of Los Angeles Historic-Cultural Monuments in Downtown Los Angeles
- List of contributing properties in the Broadway Theater and Commercial District
