= The Terrace Villa Hotel (Redlands, California) =

- Site of the hotel
- Alternative names: Hubbard Mansion

General information
- Status: Demolished
- Architectural style: Victorian
- Location: 144 The Terrace, Redlands, California
- Coordinates: 34°03′42.2″N 117°10′37.6″W
- Opened: December 26, 1886
- Closed: 1893
- Demolished: 1961

Technical details
- Floor count: 3

The Terrace Villa Hotel, was a prominent historic hotel and home located on Terrace Avenue in Redlands, California. Opened during the region's late-19th-century land boom, it served as a prominent hostelry before being converted into a private estate known as the Hubbard Mansion. The building was later repurposed as a school before its demolition in the mid-20th century.

== History ==
The hotel opened its doors on December 26, 1886, situated on a scenic elevated area of Lugonia known as "The Terrace". At the time, the surrounding community was experiencing a major economic expansion fueled by winter tourism and the burgeoning citrus industry. Along with contemporary establishments like the Windsor Hotel and the Terracina Hotel, the Terrace Villa was a key hostelry accommodating early investors, settlers, and visitors to the San Bernardino Valley.

The hotel also played a role in the local business history of the city. Redlands' first real estate agent, John Proctor Fisk, established his initial living quarters and business base within the hotel while waiting for the permanent Union Bank building to complete construction downtown Redlands. From his station at the hotel, Fisk brokered several formative land deals that shaped the development of early Redlands.

== Conversion to Hubbard Mansion ==
By the early 1890s, the local hotel market had grown increasingly crowded, leading to diminished business for several early establishments. In 1893, Fisk orchestrated the sale of the property to Anthony G. Hubbard, a wealthy mining millionaire who had accumulated a fortune from the Harquahala Mountains gold bonanza in Arizona.

Following the acquisition, Hubbard retired from active mining operations and chose to remodel the hotel structure into a lavish personal country estate for his family. Known subsequently as the Hubbard Mansion, the estate became a focal point of high society in Redlands, hosting elegant parties and gatherings throughout the late 19th and early 20th centuries.

== Later years and Demolition ==
Following its tenure as a private residence, the property transitioned into a school. The structure stood for several decades as a prominent architectural landmark on the town's northern terrace. The building was ultimately razed in 1961 to make way for I-10. Today, the site is recognized by the Redlands Area Historical Society as one of the significant "Lost Buildings" of the city's pioneer era.

== See also ==
- La Posada Hotel
- The Casa Loma Hotel
- Kimberly Crest
- Morey Mansion
