= Casa Loma Hotel (California) =

- Site of the hotel
- Alternative names: The Nichewaug

General information
- Status: Demolished
- Architectural style: Moresque-Spanish / Mission Revival
- Location: 11 East Colton Avenue, Redlands, California
- Coordinates: 34°03′47.8″N 117°10′55.0″W
- Opened: February 25, 1896
- Closed: 1939
- Demolished: 1955
- Cost: $70,000

Technical details
- Floor count: 3

Other information
- Number of rooms: 150

The Casa Loma Hotel (Spanish for "House Hill" or "House on the Knoll"), was a prominent historic luxury hotel located on the northeast corner of Colton Avenue and Orange Street in Redlands, California. Opened in February 1896, the hotel was a major attraction during the peak of the region's winter tourism and citrus boom. It is notably recognized as the first hotel in the state of California where a sitting United States president spent the night. After serving elite travelers for decades, by 1939 the building was converted into a University of Redlands student dormitory before being demolished in 1955.

== History ==
During the 1890s, expanding transcontinental railway routes brought hundreds of affluent tourists to Southern California to enjoy the mild Mediterranean climate. To capture this market, the Redlands Chamber of Commerce incentivized Colonel J.T. Ritchie to build a world-class resort hotel. Ritchie subscribed $40,000, while members of the Redlands public raised an additional $20,000 to finance the project. The hotel officially opened on February 25, 1896. On June 1, 1899, the Casa Loma Hotel Company purchased the property from Ritchie. Under the leadership of company president Edward S. Graham and manager J.H. Bohon, the hotel routinely filled to its maximum capacity during the winter season. On November 21, 1896, a group of 30 local men gathered at the hotel to form the Redlands Country Club, which went on to become Southern California's second-oldest existing golf club. In 1917, the hotel was purchased by H.H. Fiske, who renamed the property The Nichewaug after a historic estate he owned in Petersham, Massachusetts. The unusual name proved short-lived; in December 1920, subsequent owner Harry C. Hervey restored the original "Casa Loma" name.

== Design and amenities ==
The Casa Loma Hotel was a grand three-story structure situated on a prominent rise overlooking downtown Redlands. It featured 150 guest rooms built in Moresque-Spanish and Mission Revival architectural aesthetic, defined by towers, red tile roofs, arches, and a double portico wrapping across its front facade. A notable square tower on the corner functioned as a sunlit solarium. The resort marketed state-of-the-art luxuries for its era. According to an 1896 directory advertisement, premium guest suites were outfitted with private bathrooms, hot water radiators, and early localized telephones. The grounds boasted a general lounge, a dedicated ladies' parlor, fine-dining halls helmed by professional chefs, and comprehensive valet services transporting guests directly to and from local railroad stations.

== Presidential visits ==
The corner room on the second floor of the hotel came to be known as the "Presidents Suite" due to overnight stays and formal appearances by three sitting U.S. presidents.

- William McKinley (May 8, 1901): McKinley became the first U.S. president to visit, designating Redlands as the official location for the state's "Welcome to California" ceremony. Lined by residents who blanketed the pavement in rose petals, McKinley delivered an address from the Casa Loma balcony. This visit happened four months prior to his assassination.
- Theodore Roosevelt (May 7, 1903): Welcomed by a chorus of 1,400 local school children, Roosevelt stayed in the Presidential Suite and famously proclaimed the scenic, citrus-rich panorama of Redlands to be "a sight for the gods".
- William Howard Taft (October 1909): Taft visited during his presidency. Rather than disembarking to stay inside, Taft delivered a brief public speech directly from his automobile while stopped at the intersection immediately fronting the hotel (Orange Street & Colton Avenue).

== Later years and demolition ==
As modern automobile travel evolved and luxury tourism shifted away from historic grand rail-hotels, the Casa Loma's traditional customer base dwindled. In 1939, the property was acquired by the nearby University of Redlands, which repurposed the historic resort into a student housing facility renamed University Hall. The building served as a university dormitory for 16 years until 1955, when it was determined to be too costly to maintain and was demolished. In May 1956, a Stater Bros. Market grocery store opened on the footprint of the former hotel.

== Legacy ==
- The site of the hotel is marked by a commemorative plaque placed by the Daughters of the American Revolution at the corner of East Colton Avenue and Orange Street.
- The University of Redlands honors the property's historical connection through its on-campus Casa Loma Room, a premier banquet and corporate event facility.
- In 2020, the Redlands Planning Commission approved a 147-unit multi-family development located near the university named The Residences at Casa Loma, which borrows its architectural motifs directly from the original 1896 hotel design.

== Gallery ==
Hotel in 1896

Hotel in 1900

== See also ==
- La Posada Hotel
- The Terrace Villa Hotel
- Kimberly Crest
- Morey Mansion
