= Streetcars in Redlands =

Transit mode 1889 until 1936

Streetcars in Redlands transported people across the city and region from 1889 until 1936. The city's network of street railways peaked around 1908 before the patchwork of separate companies was consolidated under the Pacific Electric.

== Mule cars ==
The Redlands Street Railway (RSR) was incorporated on March 22, 1888, acquiring on June 5 a franchise from the San Bernardino County Supervisors dating to December 1887, conveying the right to construct, operate and maintain for a term of 50 years a line of street railways in Redlands, Terracina and vicinity. The initial operations began in May 1889 with a single-track line operating two-mule-team cars, the first street railway company of several to provide service to the community. The company broke ground on an extension to San Jacinto Street the following March.

== Electrification ==
Electrification and new rails replaced mules in 1899, with electrical operation beginning on December 19, 1899 over the Smiley Heights Line. Residents near Redlands Country Club were demanding streetcar access by late the following year. The Country Club Line opened on December 18, 1901 after the RSR secured land near the terminus.

The San Bernardino Valley Traction Company (SBVTC) began construction of an interurban between San Bernardino and the Redlands city limits starting in 1902. The line began regular service on March 10, 1903. Most Redlands street railways would pass to the SBVTC in a consolidation on June 3, 1903.

After being ousted from a previous position at a nearby street railroad, Henry Fischer established the Redlands Central Railway in 1907 and began construction of a line on Brookside Avenue. The Brookside–Citrus Avenue Line began operations in February 1908.

=== Pacific Electric ===
Henry E. Huntington, nephew of late Southern Pacific president Collis P. Huntington, had gained control of the four-mile-long (6.4 km) streetcar line of the Redlands Central Railway Company in 1908. Service was amalgamated under the reformed Pacific Electric Railway in the "Great Merger" of Huntington properties under new ownership by the Southern Pacific Transportation Company on February 8, 1911. The company began running their "Orange Empire Trolley Trip" tourist excursion to Redlands in 1915, which brought in day trippers from Los Angeles. Redlands was the eastern terminus of the "Big Red Car" system. At its peak, PE operated five local routes in Redlands, with streetcars running to Smiley Heights and on Orange, Olive, and Citrus Avenues.

== Decline ==
The first of Redland's streetcar lines abandoned was the Brookside Avenue–San Mateo Local Line which last ran around 1915. Starting in November 1920, interurban cars were appended to PE's Upland–San Bernardino Line at San Bernardino, providing a one-seat ride to downtown Los Angeles.

The Olive Avenue–Terracina Line was abandoned in December 1922, though a franchise car may have run as late as the following June. The West Second Avenue Line ceased service after October 1, 1924. The Country Club Line and the East Citrus Avenue–Wabash Avenue Line were abandoned after May 23, 1926.

All streetcar service ended in Redlands on July 19, 1936. This left the town as the largest city served solely by Pacific Electric buses. With 2.07 miles (3.33 km) of track into the city lifted, Bus service operated by the Motor Transit Company, a subsidiary of Pacific Electric, began on July 20. PE and Southern Pacific (parent company of PE) continued to provide freight service as far as the Sunkist packing plant at Redlands Heights on San Bernardino Avenue into at least the 1970s. The Smiley Heights line was abandoned at this time, as well. This also affected mail delivery in Redlands as "Approximately 80 percent of our mail from all directions arrives on the 5 a.m. electric car," explained Postmaster James B. Stone. "This dispatch is sorted and morning deliveries started by 8:30 a.m. on most routes. The post office department has temporarily arranged for this mail to be brought in by the Santa Fe train at 6:05 a.m. As this arrival is an hour later, our service will be one hour later." The abandoned Pacific Electric La Quinta trestle over the Santa Ana River stood immediately south of San Bernardino International Airport into the 2010s but was removed when an Amazon facility was built adjacent to the site.

=== Remnants ===
The Redlands Trolley Barn was built in 1907 and was the depot of the company's initial lines, continuing to serve in such a capacity for the Pacific Electric Era. After streetcar service ended, PE initially sold the barn; it was eventually used for various businesses since its function as a streetcar barn ended. The building was added to the National Register of Historic Places in 1991.

== Commuter rail ==
Commuter rail service began to Redlands in 2022. Construction on the Arrow commuter rail service started on July 19, 2019. The construction project included replacing all track on the line, rebuilding five bridges, and installing 24 grade crossings. Ribbon cutting celebrations were held on Friday, October 21, 2022, and the line opened on Monday, October 24, 2022. The San Bernardino Line of the Greater Los Angeles regional transportation system Metrolink services Redlands–Downtown station.
