= Charlie Chung =

American professional golfer (1902–1998)

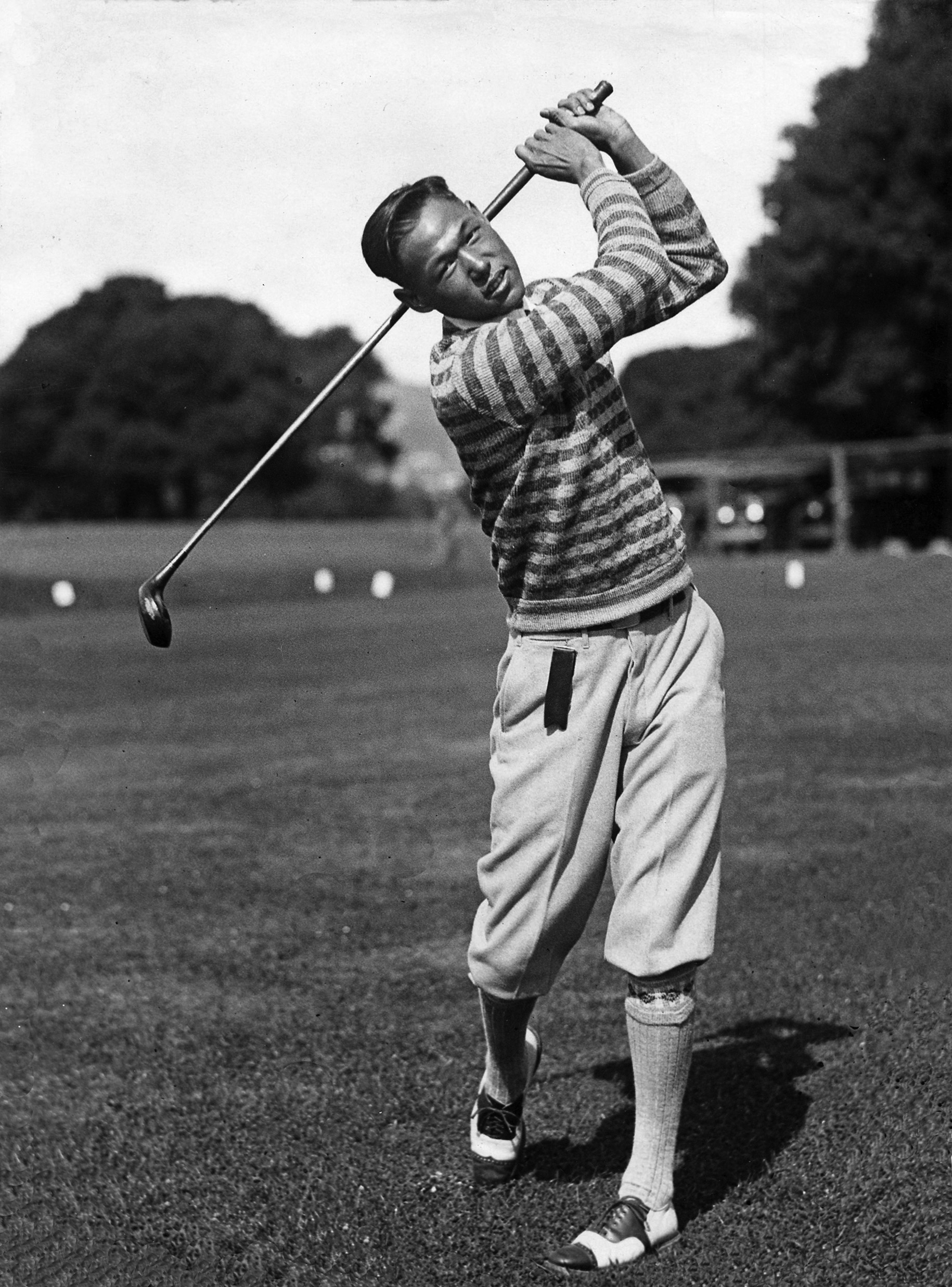
- Chung at Pebble Beach in 1925

Personal information
- Full name: Charles Kim Seong Chung
- Nationality: United States
- Born: October 12, 1902 Honolulu, Hawaii, U.S.
- Died: July 3, 1998 (aged 95) Honolulu, Hawaii, U.S.
- Spouse: Mildred M. Morimoto (m. 1942 d. 2012)
- Children: 2

Career
- Sport: Golf
- Turned professional: 1926

Achievements and awards
- Hawaii Golf Hall of Fame: 1995

Portrait in 1929 news article

Charles Chung (October 12, 1902 – July 3, 1998) was a Chinese-American professional golfer. The back-to-back winner of the 1924 and 1925 Manoa Cup awarded to the amateur champion golfer of Hawaii, Chung relocated to Los Angeles, California, where he became the first Chinese-American professional golfer and pioneer non-white member of the Professional Golfers' Association of America.

Chung was a 1995 inductee into the Hawaii Golf Hall of Fame.

== Early life ==
Charles Chung, commonly known by the nickname "Charlie", was born in Honolulu, Hawaii in 1902 of ethnic Chinese parents who came from Canton Province, China to work as indentured servants on the plantations of Hawaii. In his early years, Chung's family lived in Nuuanu Valley and his parents had moved from the plantations to work on truck farms. Chung supplemented the family income by selling local fruits and vegetables.

Chung left school after the eighth grade to work and support his family. As a teenager, he was a clerk for E.O. Hall and Sons, a sporting goods company.

Chung had an affection for the game of golf at an early age, first playing on his own with crude clubs fashioned of guava sticks. Chung's love for the game drove him to take a job as a caddie at the Oahu Country Club as a young boy, where he gained access to the course and equipment. Chung credited his development as a golfer to local player Jimmy Greigh, for whom he caddied for a number of years and who provided him in turn with quality instruction.

Chung quit his caddie's position in 1918 and joined the Honolulu Golf Club as a member himself the following year, where he further developed his game. As an adult Chung was able to drive the ball up to 250 yards – no mean feat given the primitive equipment of the day. Chung regarded his pitching wedge as the best of the eight clubs in his bag, however.

== Amateur career ==
Success came quickly for Chung on the Hawaiian amateur golf circuit, including three victories at the Moanalua Championship and two runner-up finishes in the Hawaiian Open. Chung's second-place finish in the 1921 Hawaiian Open helped motivate him to take his game to tournaments in the United States. Chung left Hawaii for the United States mainland for the first time the following year, where he participated in the U.S. Open at the Skokie Country Club in Glencoe, Illinois in July and the U.S. Amateur at The Country Club in Brookline, Massachusetts in September.

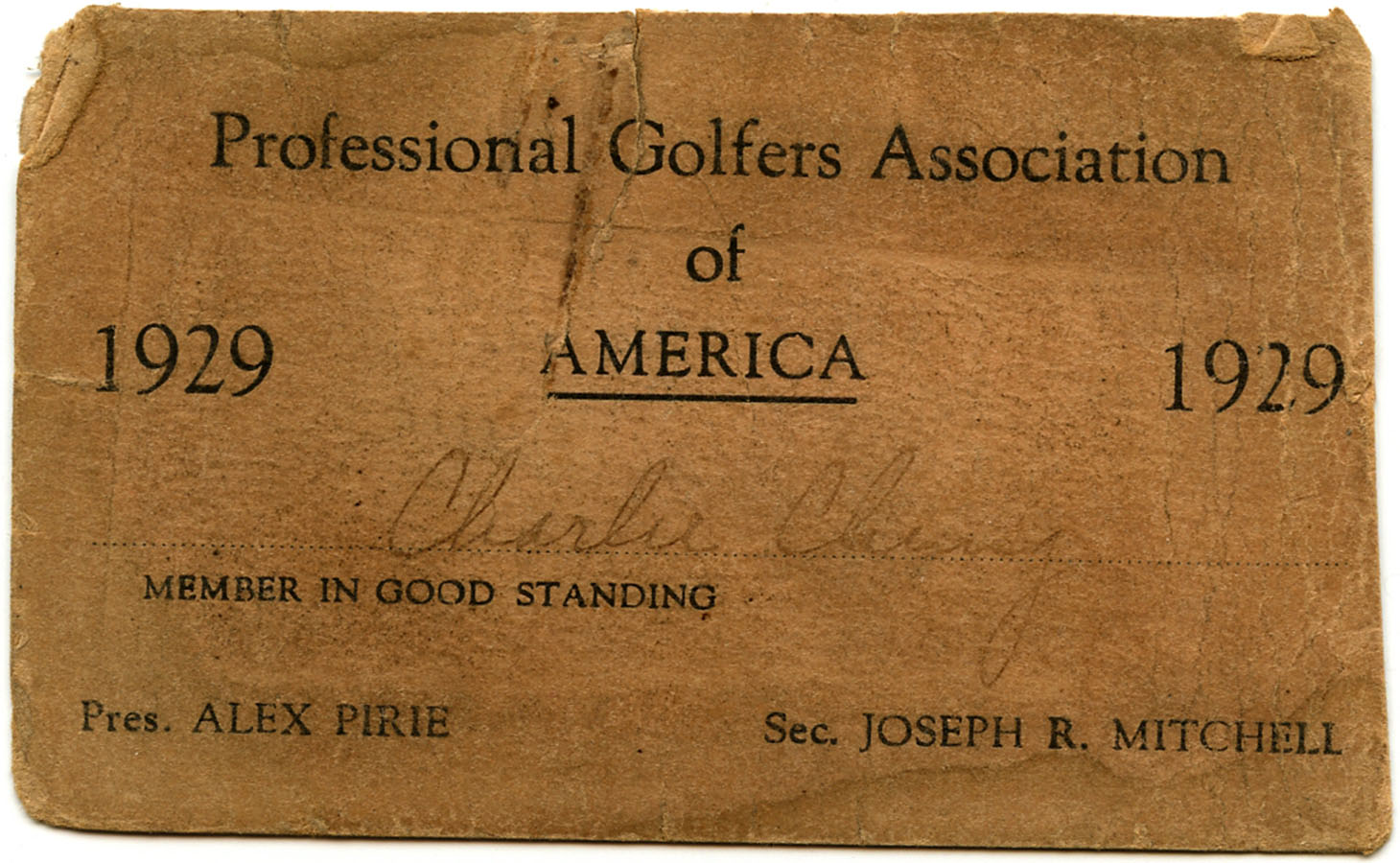

Chung's participation in the white-dominated world of American golf was met with frequent ridicule in sports pages of the country, with one 1922 story patronizingly referring to Chung as "the only big league oriental golf shark of the links" and intimated that he learned of the sport from the "strange words used by 'humorable boss'" while working as a clerk in a sugar company office. "One day Charlie learned that this language referred to a game called golf and soon he was forsaking his clerkly duties for the tees," the wire story mockingly and falsely alleged.

Back in Hawaii, Chung won the 1924 Manoa Cup, an amateur championship tournament played annually at the Honolulu Golf Club (today's Oahu Country Club). Chung repeated as Hawaii's amateur champion the following year, emerging victorious in a revised format under which the final two rounds made use of the match play format.

Chung became the first non-white player to play at the Pebble Beach golf course in 1925 when he was invited to play the California State Amateur tournament. Chung did well in the State Amateur. He tied George Von Elm (who went on to win the tournament) for second at the end of the medal qualifying rounds, but was eliminated by former champion Max Behr in the first round of match play. He then went on to win the defeated sixteen. Jack James, writer for the San Francisco Examiner, headlined Chung as "Hero in Defeat - Used Savings to come to U.S." James noted that the real story of the State Amateur was not the winner but the loser, Charlie Chung, who invaded the rich man's game and proved that a young man of moderate means can keep up with those "more freely blessed" with worldly goods. He admired Chung for taking the loss like a sportsman and a Chinese gentlemen, "whom there is no finer specimen of the breed in the world." Bill Wise, Los Angeles Times columnist, wrote that Chung "is going to write history in California golf annals." E.Z Crane said Chung "has done a lot for Hawaii in the way of publicity during his present tour" and wondered whether Chung would turn professional. Crane later described Chung as the second best amateur golfer on the Pacific Coast, second to George Von Elm, quoting Willard Crummy, professional at the distinguished White Bear Yacht Club course in St. Paul, Minnesota.

In December 1925, the most prominent golf publication of its time, The American Golfer (edited by Grantland Rice), featured Chung in a full page article. Author Frank P. Noon headlined Chung as the "Only Champion Chinese Golfer" and described his golfing accomplishments, his dreams and ambitions and Confucian philosophy toward the game.

== Professional career ==
His amateur success gained him notice and employment the following year when the Redlands Country Club of Redlands, California, hired him as its club professional. Chung became a member of the PGA of America even before its bylaws were formally changed to allow the membership of non-whites.

In 1929, Chung returned to his native Hawaii to take a position as club professional at the Moanalua Golf Club in Honolulu. He later moved on to a position as club pro at the Maui Country Club before finishing up as manager of the Pali Golf Course from 1957 to 1970.Lyle Nelson described Chung as the "first oriental to head a mainland club" and "first oriental to win" the Manoa Cup.

By the early 1930s, Chung's golfing career ended, crippled by bursitis in his shoulders. Chung desperately tried all reputable and quack medical cures – even removing all his teeth – but to no avail. He would never again play competitively.

== Personal life ==
Chung died July 3, 1998, at the Aloha Nursing and Rehabilitation Center in Kaneohe. He was 95 years old at the time of his death.

Chung was survived by his wife, son, and daughter. At the time of his father's death, his son Ronald Chung recalled him as "a poor Chinese guy who was a very good golfer. All these rich guys used to take him golfing. Dad said he always took their money."

== Awards and honors ==
In 1995, Chung was inducted into the Hawaii Golf Hall of Fame. Chung was recognized by Monte Ito for his pioneering days in the golf world.
