= Kimberly Crest =

Historic house in California, United States

- U.S. National Register of Historic Places
- California Historical Landmark No. 1019
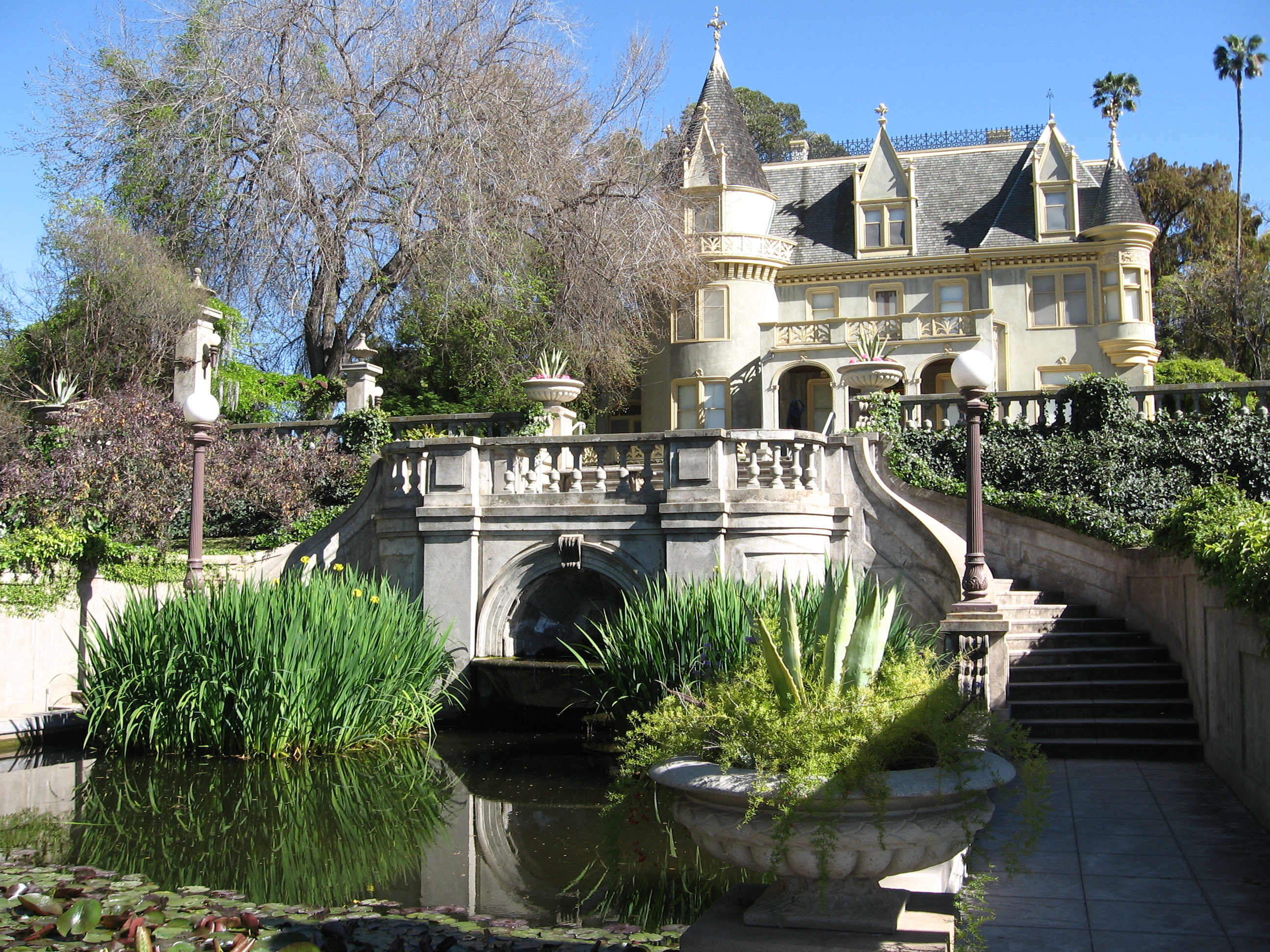
- Kimberly Crest house and gardens

- Location within California Location within the United States
- Location: Redlands, California
- Coordinates: 34°2′16.21″N 117°10′20.87″W
- Built: 1897
- Architects: Lyman Farwell; Oliver Perry Dennis
- Architectural style: Victorian, Châteauesque
- NRHP reference No.: 96000328
- CHISL No.: 1019
- Added to NRHP: March 28, 1996

Kimberly Crest House and Gardens is a French château-style Victorian mansion located in Redlands, California. The property is a registered California Historical Landmark and is listed on the National Register of Historic Places.

== History ==
The house was built in 1897 for Mrs Cornelia A. Hill, one of the pioneers of Redlands. In 1905, John Alfred Kimberly, a co-founder of the Kimberly-Clark paper company, purchased the home to escape the Wisconsin winters, giving the family name to the property. When the Kimberly family purchased the property in 1905, Mrs Kimberly had the Italian gardens installed on the property. The family celebrated the holidays at the property with a 90-foot (27 m) magnolia tree adorned with 6000 watts of light. The Kimberly family continued to live in the home until the death in 1979 of Mary Kimberly Shirk, the widowed daughter of John Alfred Kimberly.

Before her death, Mrs Shirk challenged the city of Redlands to raise the funds to purchase 39 acres (0.06 sq mi; 0.16 km^{2}) of the property around the home and turn it into a botanical park. If the funds were raised, she promised to bequeath the mansion and the estate of 6.25 acres (0.01 sq mi; 0.03 km^{2}) immediately around it to the city. The city raised the funds, and the surrounding grounds became known as Prospect Park. At her death, Mrs Shirk left the home to "the people of Redlands" and, using the proceeds from the sale to the city of the Prospect Park property, established the Kimberly-Shirk Association, which continues to care for the home today.

Prior to the conversion to a museum, the mansion served as one of the filming locations for the 1981 movie Hell Night, starring Linda Blair. In the film, tunnels were depicted, but the house and the estate have no such feature. Later, the grounds served as the setting of Fleetwood Mac's "Big Love" video. Shots depicting the inside of the home were filmed on a sound stage.

== Architecture ==
The three-story Victorian mansion was designed in the Châteauesque style by Oliver Perry Dennis and Lyman Farwell, a Los Angeles-based partnership. The building contains over 7,000 square feet (650 m^{2}) of floor space. A near replica, now known as The Magic Castle, was designed by the same architects and erected in Hollywood in 1909.

== Gardens ==
The gardens that surround Kimberly Crest are exquisite examples of the Italian style favored by Victorian homeowners at the turn of the 20th century. Mr Kimberly had the current gardens created in 1909, complete with statuary and koi ponds. Today the gardens are honorary members of the Inland Koi Society, which now maintains the lily ponds.

== The mansion today ==
The Kimberly-Shirk Association has maintained the property since 1981 and continues the legacy of Mrs Shirk's involvement in civic events. Kimberly Crest is open to the public for tours and can also be booked for weddings and private events. Tours are Thursday, Friday, and Sunday. Tours are available every half hour with the last tour taking off at 3:30 pm.

== See also ==
- California Historical Landmarks in San Bernardino County, California
- Casa Loma Hotel
- LA Posada Hotel
- The Terrace Villa Hotel (Redlands, California)
- Morey Mansion

== Gallery ==
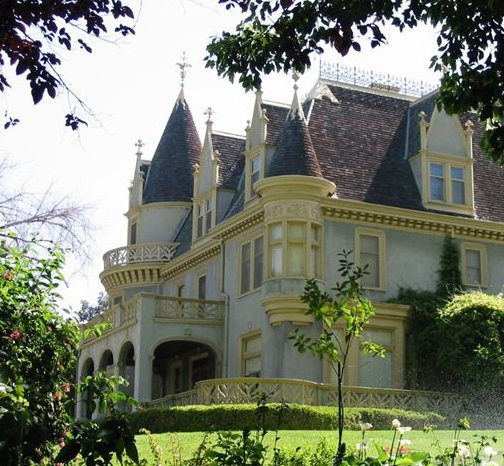
Châteauesque Kimberly Crest home viewed from road.

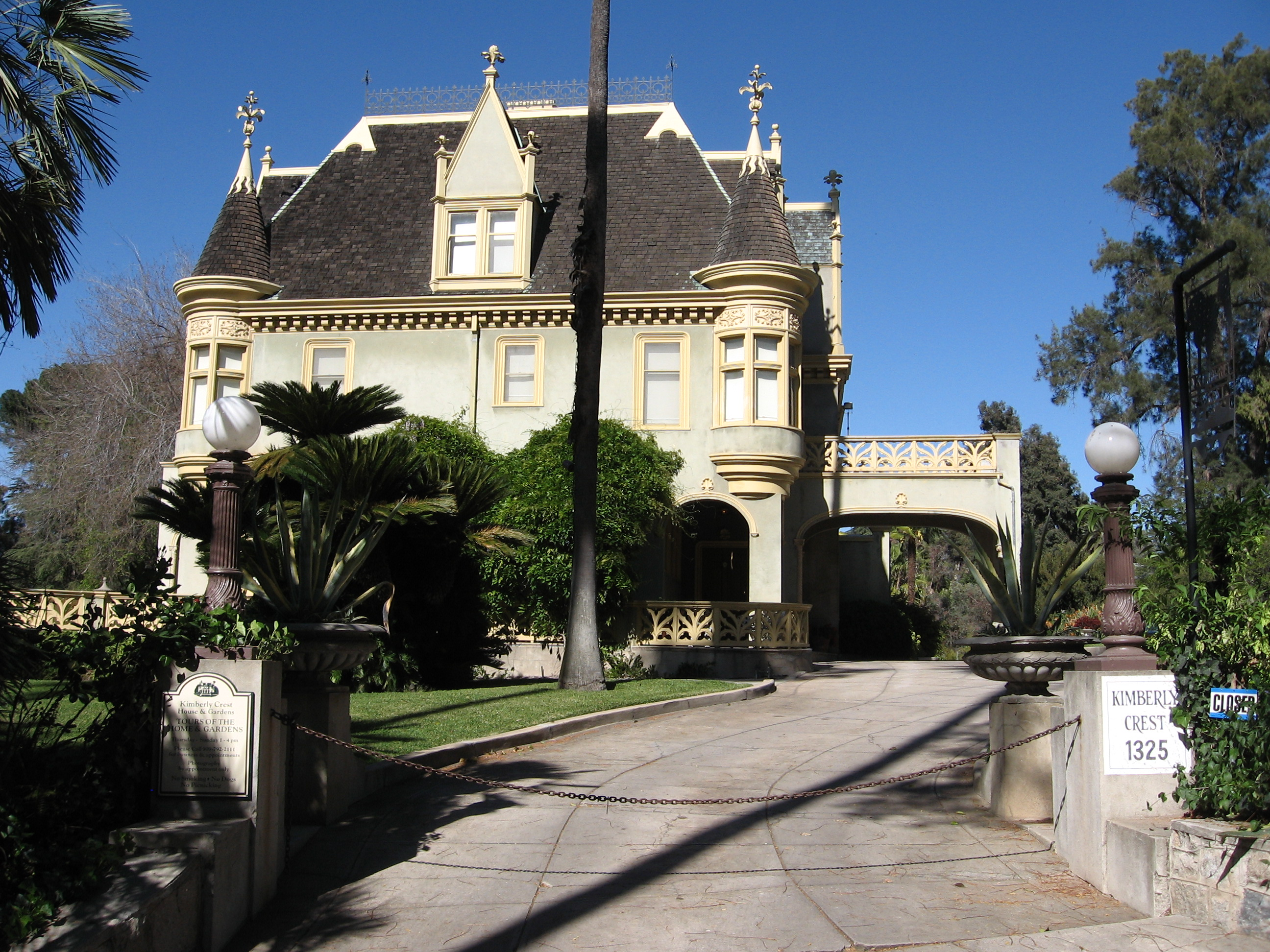
Driveway to porte-cochere and principal entrance at the architectural rear of the house.

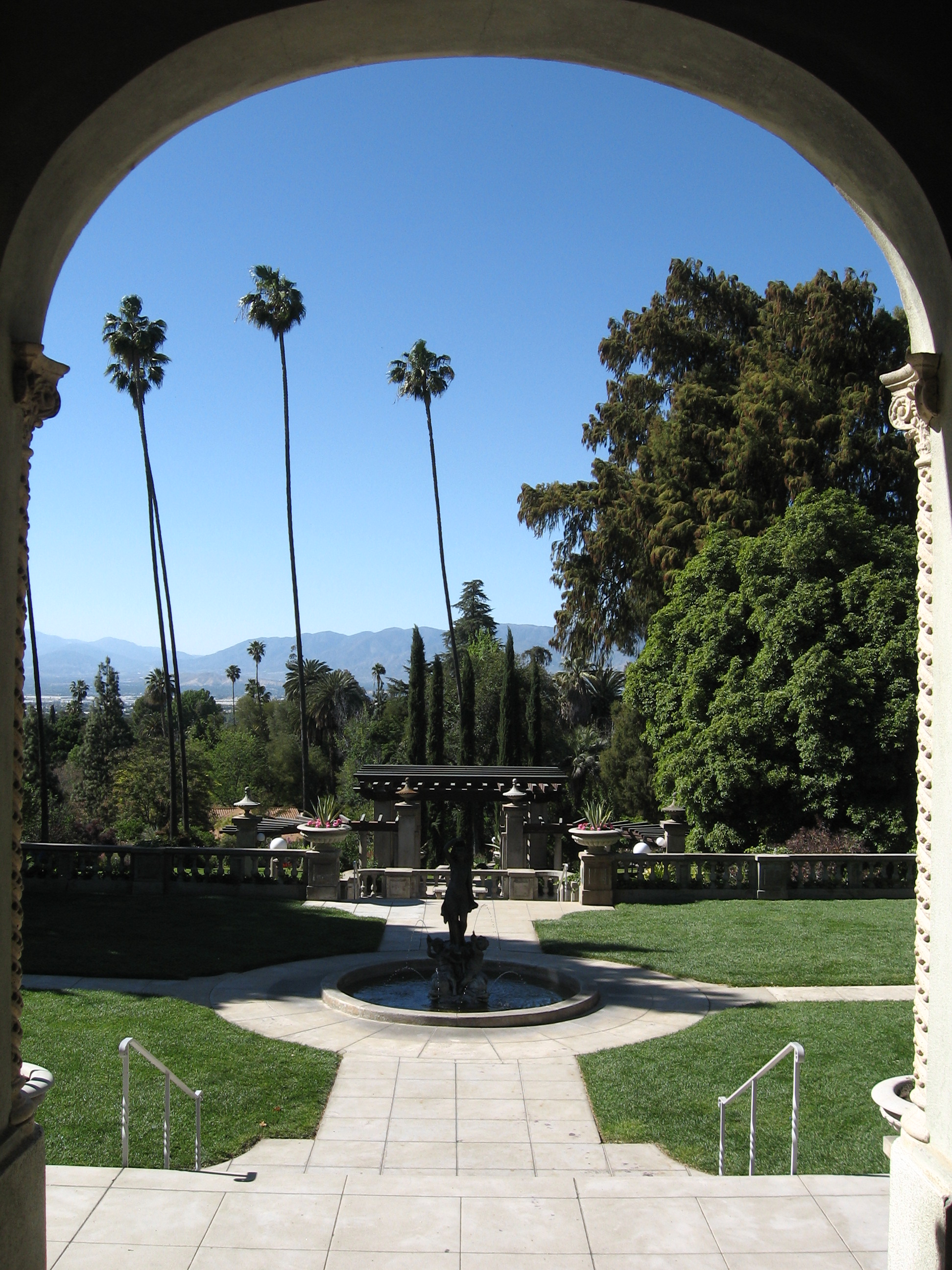
View from the front porch showing the gardens and the San Bernardino Valley beyond.

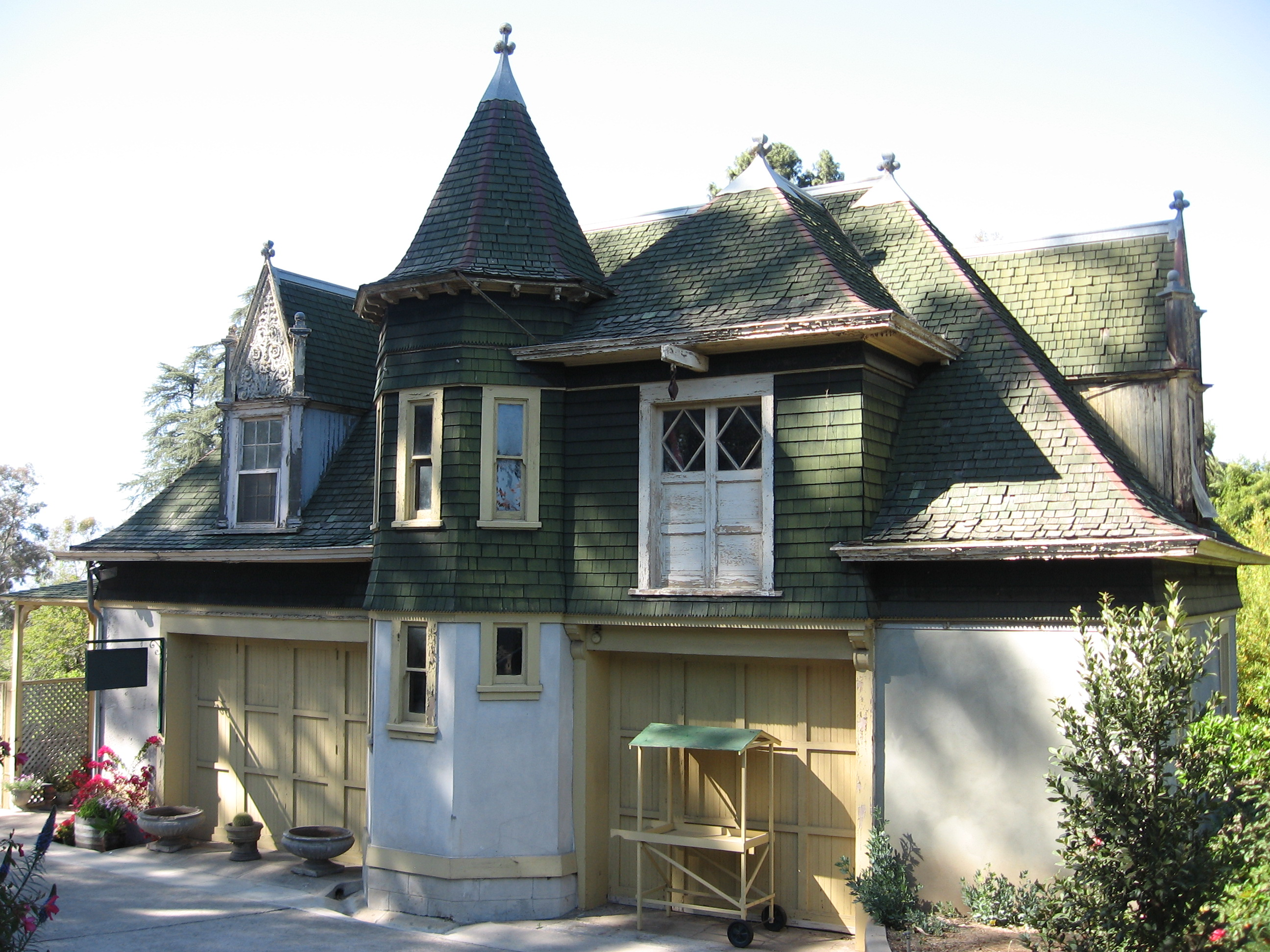
Kimberly Crest carriage house.
