= Lyman Farwell =

American politician

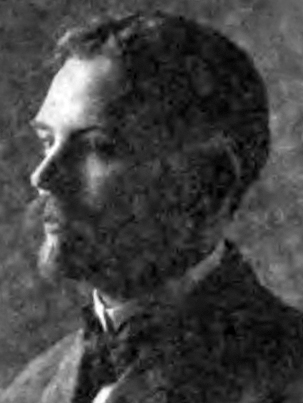

Member of the California State Assembly
- In office January 2, 1911 – January 4, 1915
- Preceded by: Philip A. Stanton
- Succeeded by: James Stuart McKnight
- Constituency: 71st district (1911–1913); 75th district (1913–1915)

Personal details
- Born: December 19, 1864 St. Paul, Minnesota, U.S.
- Died: November 4, 1933 (aged 68) Los Angeles, California, U.S.
- Resting place: Rosedale Cemetery
- Party: Republican
- Spouse: Flora A. Howes
- Children: 3 sons
- Education: Massachusetts Institute of Technology
- Occupation: Architect

Lyman Farwell (December 19, 1864 – November 4, 1933) was an American architect and politician. As the co-founder of the architectural firm Dennis and Farwell, he designed many buildings in Los Angeles County. He also served in the California State Assembly.

== Early life ==
Farwell was born on December 19, 1864, in St. Paul, Minnesota to Frank Ball Farwell, a hardware businessman, and Mary Mason. He had one brother.

Farwell graduated from the Massachusetts Institute of Technology in 1887, and he studied at the École des Beaux-Arts in Paris in 1890-1891.

== Career ==
Farwell began his career as a draftsman at McKim, Mead & White in New York City in 1892, then began as an architect in 1894. From 1895 to 1913, Farwell was a partner in Dennis and Farwell, an architectural firm he co-founded with Oliver Perry Dennis.

Farwell served as a member of the California State Assembly twice from 1911 to 1915. He also served on the Planning Commission for the City of Los Angeles and he was a director of the Better America Federation.

=== List of works ===
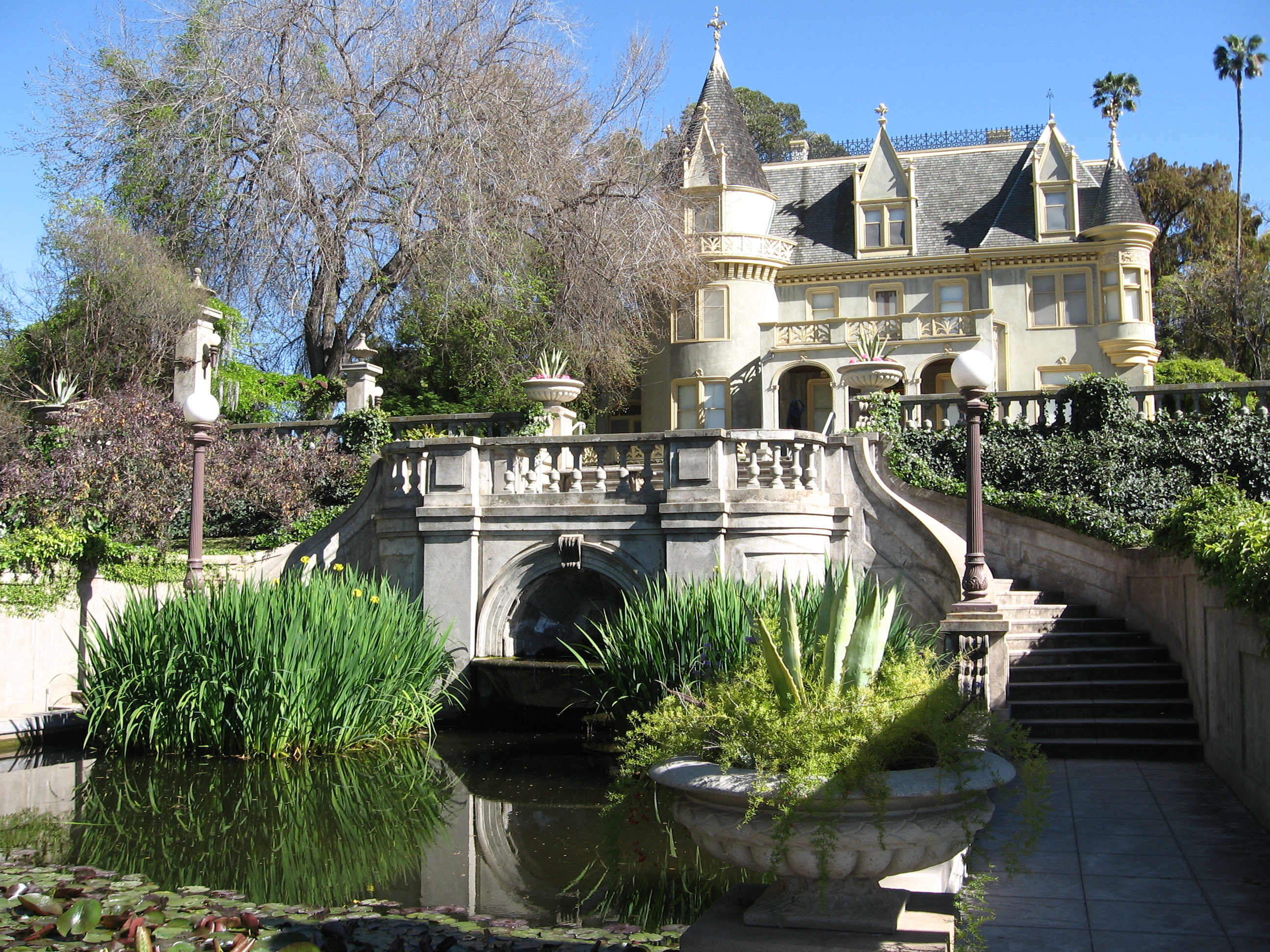
Kimberly Crest in 2008

Farwell's most notable works were done during his time at Dennis and Farwell. These projects include:

- Kimberly Crest, Redlands (1897), NRHP-listed CHL No. 1019

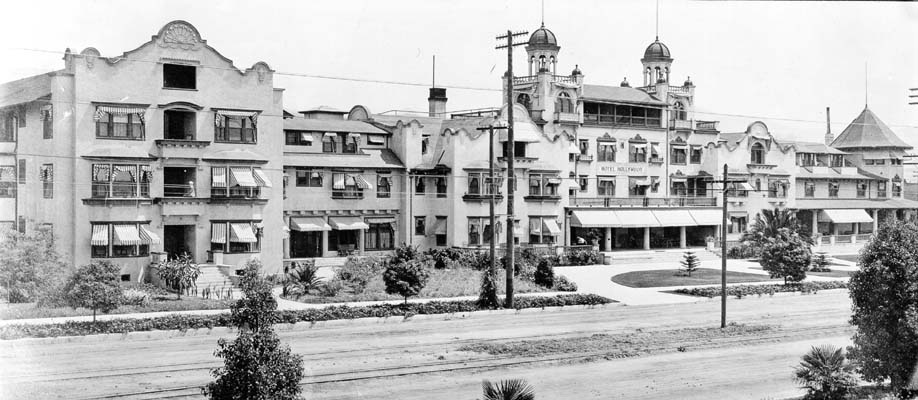
Hollywood Hotel in 1905

- Hollywood Hotel (1902)
- Janes House (1903), NRHP-listed, LAHCM No. 227
- Santa Ana Public Library No. 1, Santa Ana (1903)
- Hollywood Art Center School (1904), LAHCM No. 1202
- Cline Residence (1906), LAHCM No. 854
- Rollin B. Lane House (1909), a near mirror duplicate of Kimberly Crest, LAHCM No. 406

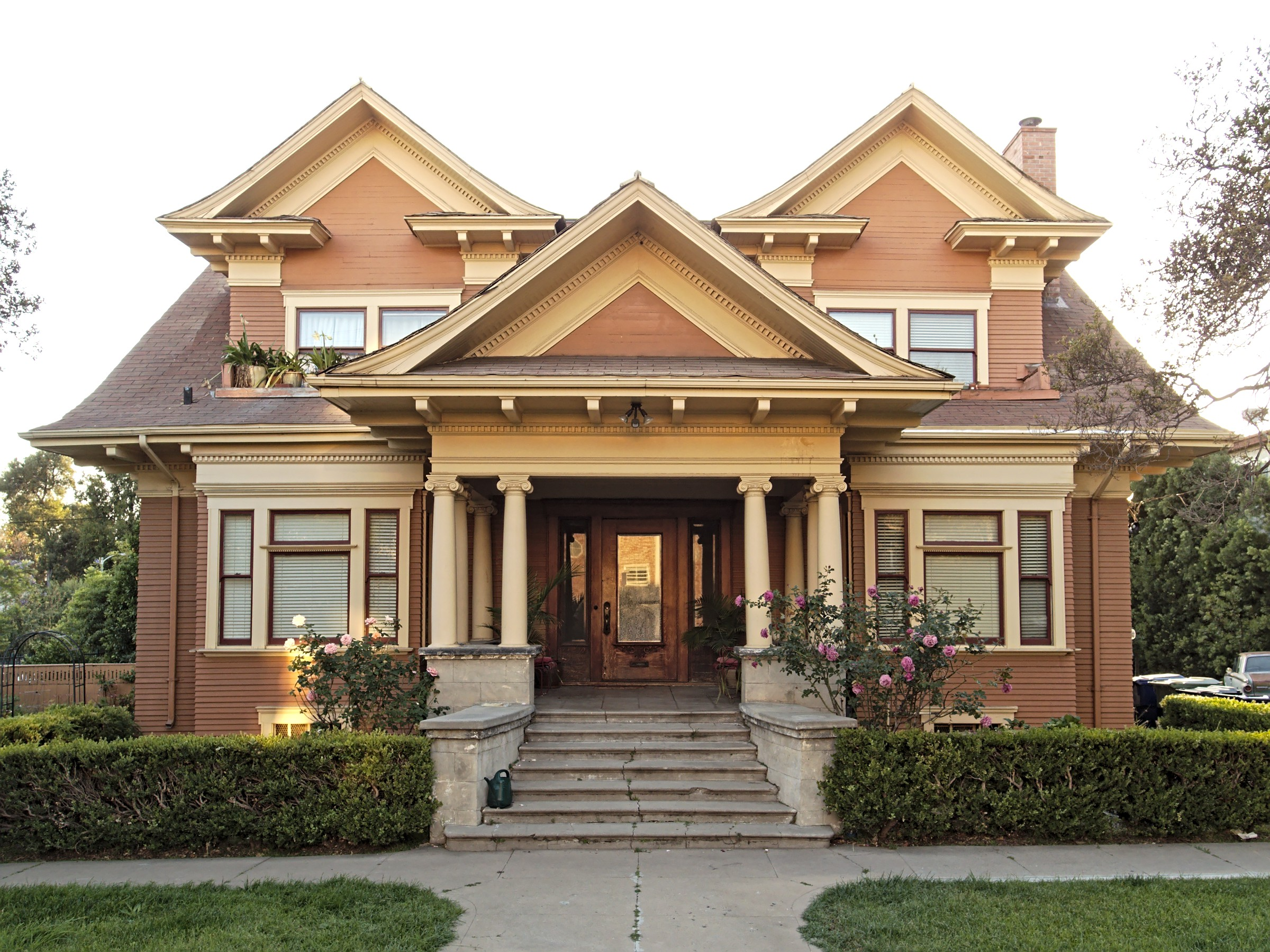
James R. Toberman House in 2015

- James R. Toberman House (1909), LAHCM No. 769
- Iowa Building (1910)
- Los Angeles Police Department Boyle Heights Station (1911-1912)
- Occidental College Hall of Letters

Other notable works by Farwell include:

- Moneta Branch Library (1923), NRHP-listed

== Personal life and death ==
Farwell married Flora Howes in 1901. The couple gave birth to four children by 1910, three of whom survived to that year. All three were boys.

Farwell died of a heart attack on November 4, 1933. His funeral was held at St James' Episcopal Church, and he was buried in the Rosedale Cemetery.
