= Oliver Perry Dennis =

American architect

- Born: August 25, 1858; Delaware County, New York
- Died: July 14, 1927 (aged 68); Los Angeles, California
- Occupation: Architect
- Known for: Kimberly Crest; Hollywood Hotel; Janes House; Magic Castle
- Spouse: Rosella Miller (1887-pre.1910)

Oliver Perry Dennis (August 25, 1858 – July 14, 1927) was an American architect. As co-founder of the architectural firm Dennis and Farwell, he designed many buildings in Los Angeles County, California, including the Hollywood Hotel, Janes House, and the Magic Castle. He also designed or co-designed several buildings in Tacoma, Washington.

== Early life ==
Oliver Perry Dennis was born on August 25, 1858, in Delaware County, New York, to Oliver H. Dennis, a farmer, and Julia Ann Brumley. Oliver lived with his family including his maternal grandmother from 1858 to at least 1865. The family moved to Sanilac County in northeastern Michigan sometime between 1865 and 1870, and by 1875 they had moved again, this time to a farm in Chautauqua, New York.

Oliver's mother died of paralysis sometime between 1880 and 1892, after which his father remarried, then died in or after 1899. Oliver had four brothers, two sisters, and at least two step-brothers.

== Career ==
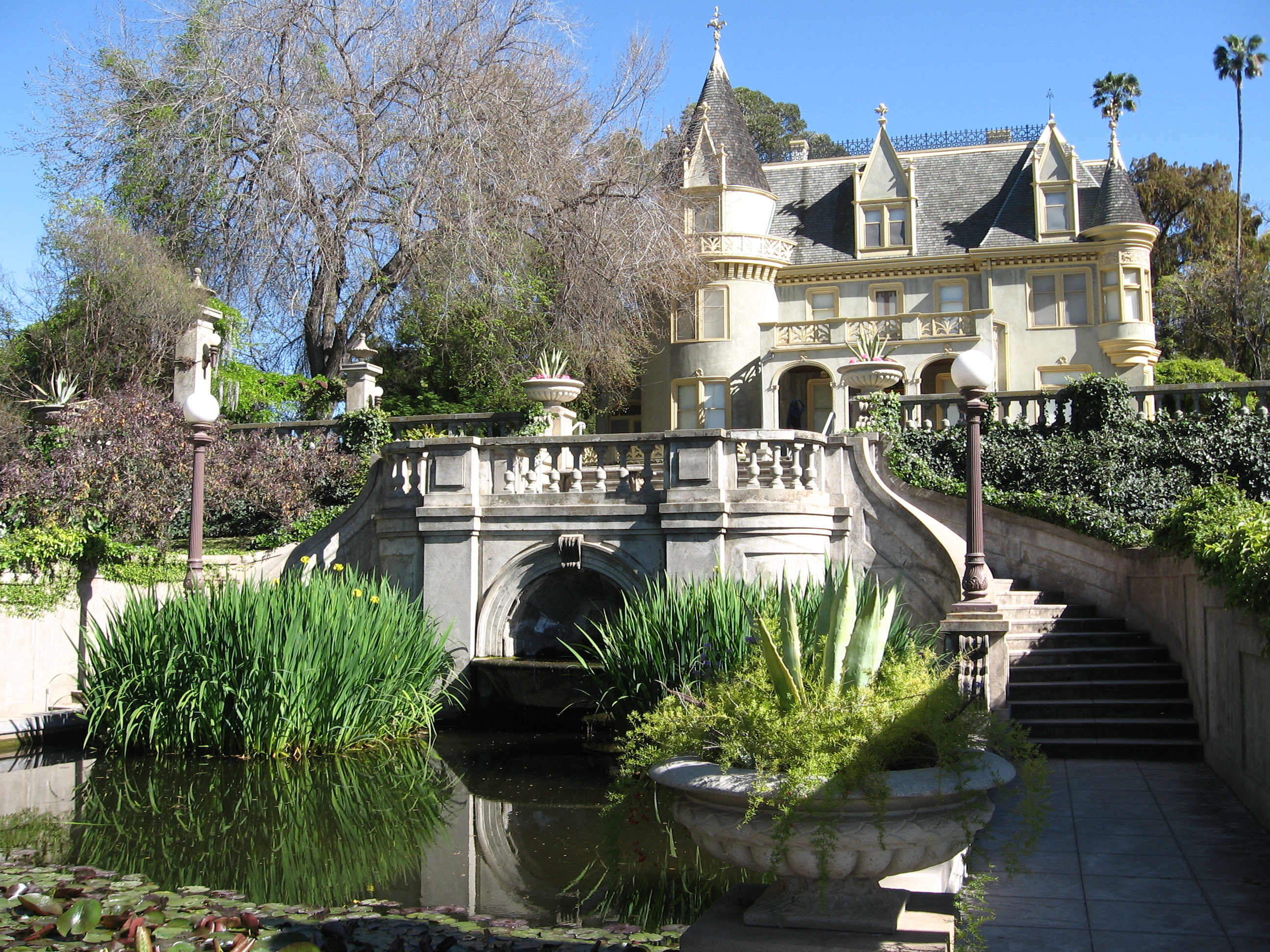
Kimberly Crest in 2008

By 1880, Oliver P. was working as a carpenter. He worked as an architect in Tacoma, Washington from 1888 to 1901, with the majority of his work done in partnership with John G. Proctor. In 1896, he partnered with Lyman Farwell to create Dennis and Farwell in Los Angeles, California. In 1914, he once again worked on his own, and the following year he became partner at Dennis and Rasche. He went solo again in 1919.

Oliver P.'s most notable works were done during his time at Dennis and Farwell. These projects include (in Los Angeles unless otherwise noted):

- Kimberly Crest, Redlands (1897), NRHP-listed CHL No. 1019

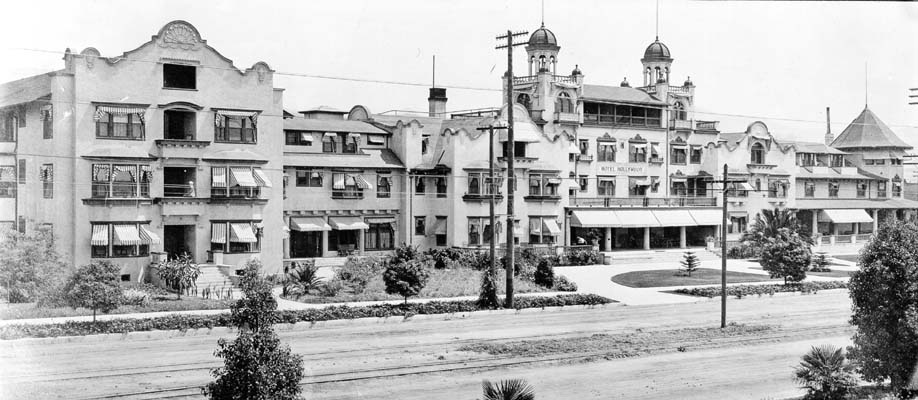
Hollywood Hotel in 1905

- Hollywood Hotel (1902)
- Janes House (1903), NRHP-listed, LAHCM No. 227
- Santa Ana Public Library No. 1, Santa Ana (1903)
- Hollywood Art Center School (1904), LAHCM No. 1202
- Cline Residence (1906), LAHCM No. 854
- Rollin B. Lane House (1909), a near mirror duplicate of Kimberly Crest, LAHCM No. 406

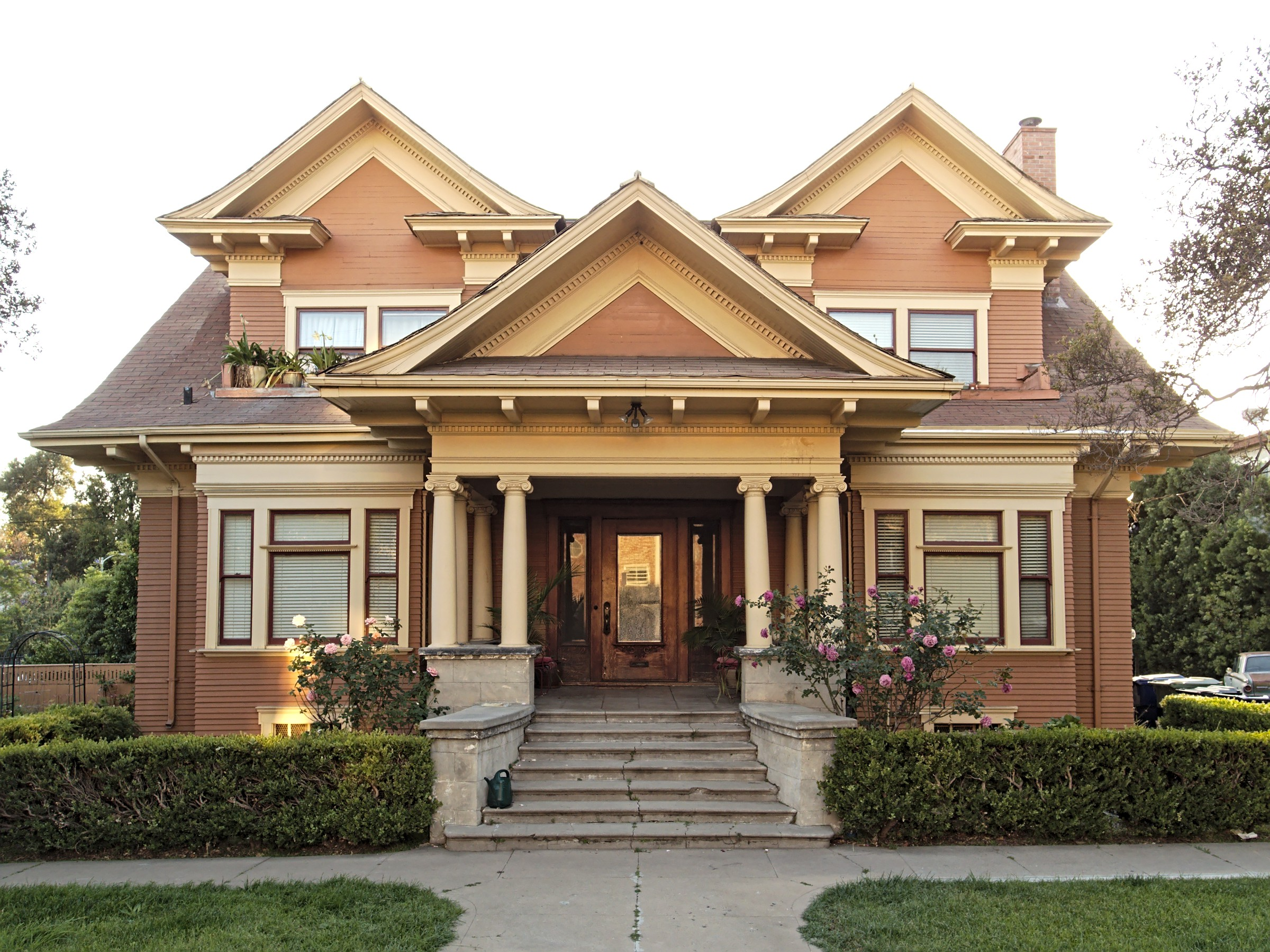
James R. Toberman House in 2015

- James R. Toberman House (1909), LAHCM No. 769
- Iowa Building (1910)
- Los Angeles Police Department Boyle Heights Station (1911-1912)
- Occidental College Hall of Letters

Select Oliver Perry Dennis works in Washington include (in Tacoma unless otherwise noted):

- Hotel Bostwick (1888–1889)
- Barlow-Catlin Building (1889–1890)
- Western Washington Industrial Exposition Building (1889–1891)

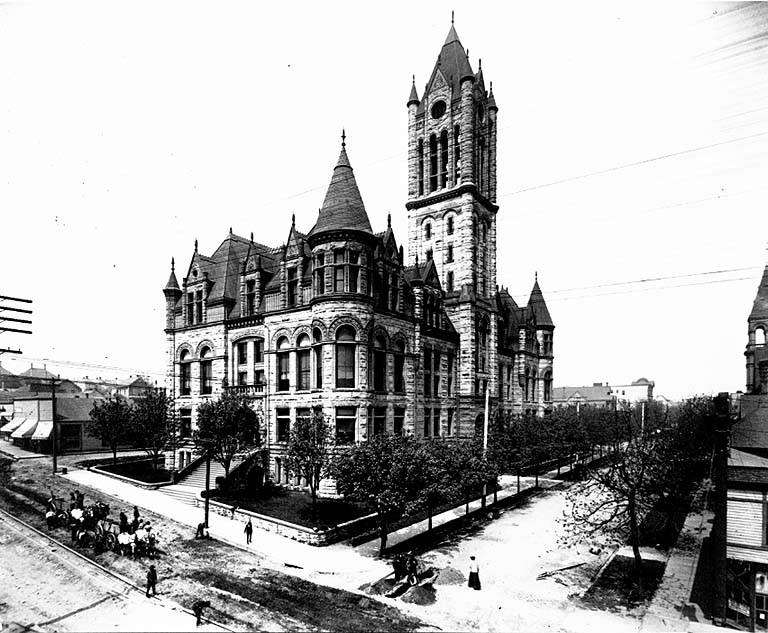
Pierce County Courthouse in 1895

- Pierce County Courthouse (1890–1893)
- Charles Marble House (1892)
- Western Washington Hospital for the Insane, Lakewood (1893 addition)
- Nelson Bennett House
- Massasoit Hotel

Additional select Oliver Perry Dennis works in California include (in Los Angeles unless otherwise noted):

- Westlake Masonic Temple (1914)
- Ralph Huntsberger House (1914–1915)
- Vendome Street Apartment Building (1916)
- Rialto Theater (1916–1917), NRHP-listed, LAHCM No. 1202
- Florence Theater, Pasadena (1917)
- Columbia Trust Building
- Archie Freeman House
- Loveland House
- Young Men's Christian Association South Broadway Building
- William T. Gould House, Beverly Hills
- Naples Hotel, Long Beach

== Personal life and death ==
Oliver P. married Rosella Miller on December 22, 1887, in Minneapolis, Minnesota. They had two children together and divorced some time before 1910. Both children lived with their mother after the divorce.

Oliver P. died on July 14, 1927, and was buried at Hollywood Forever Cemetery.

== See also ==
- List of American architects
- List of people from Los Angeles
