= Hollywood Hotel =

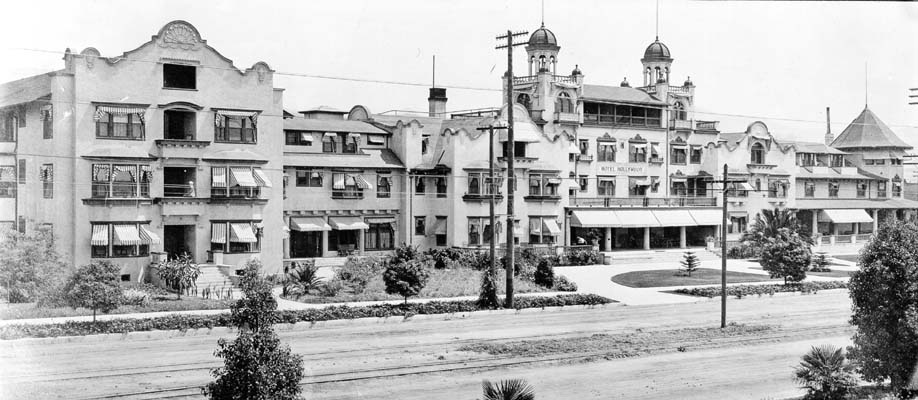
- Hollywood Hotel in 1905

General information
- Architectural style: Mission Revival
- Coordinates: 34.1020°N 118.3397°W
- Opened: 1902
- Demolished: 1956
- Owner: H.J. Whitley; Almira Hershey; George Krom; Charles E. Toberman

Design and construction
- Architecture firm: Dennis and Farwell

Other information
- Public transit: Balloon Route

Hollywood Hotel was a hotel, society venue and an early Hollywood landmark, formerly located on Hollywood Boulevard and between Highland Avenue and Orchid Avenue in central Hollywood, Los Angeles, California, United States. It was constructed in 1902 and demolished in 1956.

== History ==
=== Early years ===
Original 1902 Hollywood Hotel

Hollywood Hotel opened in December 1902. It was designed and built by Lyman Farwell and Oliver Perry Dennis for early Hollywood developer H.J. Whitley, to support selling residential lots to potential buyers arriving from Los Angeles by the electric Balloon Route trolley of the Los Angeles Pacific Railroad. It was developed on property owned by Harrison Gray Otis, George Hoover, and Whitley. Located on the west side of Highland Avenue, the elegant wood structure with Mission Revival style stucco facades and broad verandas also fronted unpaved Prospect Avenue, lined with California pepper trees. The hotel was sited among lemon groves and then at the base of the Hollywood Hills, part of the Santa Monica Mountains in the area. Whitley was instrumental in improvements to Prospect Avenue, which in 1910 was renamed Hollywood Boulevard. Increasing business compelled the building of an additional 40-room wing onto the hotel in 1905.

Whitley surrounded the hotel with 3 acres (1.2 ha) of cultivated gardens. He operated the establishment as a country resort hotel as the developing community of Hollywood first established itself.

In 1906 the heiress Almira Hershey, who was then living in a mansion on Bunker Hill in Downtown Los Angeles, took a buggy ride to see the hotel that was being advertised in the Los Angeles Times. She was so impressed with Hollywood Hotel she decided to buy it. She hired Margaret J. Anderson who had worked for her at the Darby and the Fremont Hotels, which Hershey owned, as manager. Under Anderson's management, the hotel expanded from 16 rooms to 250 and became well known in the area, but the two women had a contentious relationship and Anderson left to move to the Beverly Hills Hotel in 1912.

=== Motion picture era ===
The fame of Hollywood Hotel, like that of Hollywood, came from its identification with the Hollywood movie industry, beginning in the 1910s. Those who stayed at the hotel included Jesse Lasky, Carl Laemmle, Louis B. Mayer, Harry Warner, and Irving Thalberg. Producers, directors, writers and technicians held conferences on the broad verandas.

There was a 'stream' of silent film movie stars and movie moguls passing through. Some of the movie industry people resided in the hotel, and many attended the dances held on Thursday nights in the ballroom. It was considered "the" place to be seen and the cultural center of Hollywood. To identify where certain people regularly sat to dine, the hotel had stars with the names of celebrities painted on the ceiling above their tables.

Among the scores of movie stars who stayed at Hollywood Hotel was Rudolph Valentino, who lived in room 264. He met his first wife, Jean Acker, in the hotel, where they were married in 1919 and spent their honeymoon. Other stars included Ethel Barrymore, Norma Shearer, and Valentino's second wife Natasha Rambova. The hotel also hosted notable guests from beyond Los Angeles and the United States.

Songwriter Carrie Jacobs Bond composed her famous song A Perfect Day, and sang it, while a guest at Hollywood Hotel.

In 1922 Almira Hershey lost a breach of contract dispute with the hotel's long time manager George Krom, which allowed him to purchase the hotel.

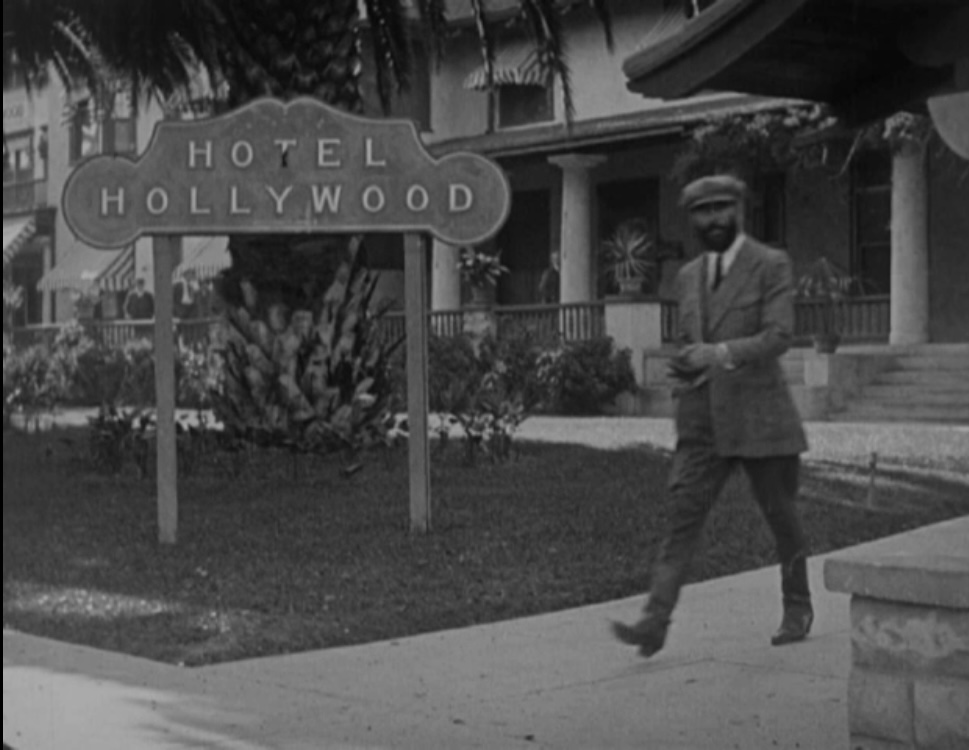
Screencap from promotional film Hollywood Snapshots (1922)

=== Decline and demolition ===
In the early 1940s, Charles E. Toberman, a real estate developer who was known as "Mr. Hollywood," acquired all the stock of the Good Hope Company, which owned Hollywood Hotel. He wanted to tear it down then and redevelop the block, but was halted because of the restrictions on building materials during World War II.

By the 1950s, the hotel was run down and faded from its former glory. Developers were adamant that renovating and restoring the property was out of the question.

Though Hollywood Hotel was an architectural landmark and housed many of the great Hollywood stars in its day, it was razed in August 1956 to make way for a US$10 million ($118 million in 2025) development. It was replaced by a twelve story office building for the First Federal Savings & Loan Association of Hollywood, a shopping center, and parking lots.

In 2001 those were demolished, and the Hollywood and Highland Center shopping and entertainment complex was built on the site. It includes the Dolby Theatre (formerly known as the Kodak Theatre), the current home of the annual Academy Awards ceremony.

== See also ==
- Mission Revival architecture in California
