= Redlands Trolley Barn =

- Redlands Central Railway Company Car Barn
- U.S. National Register of Historic Places
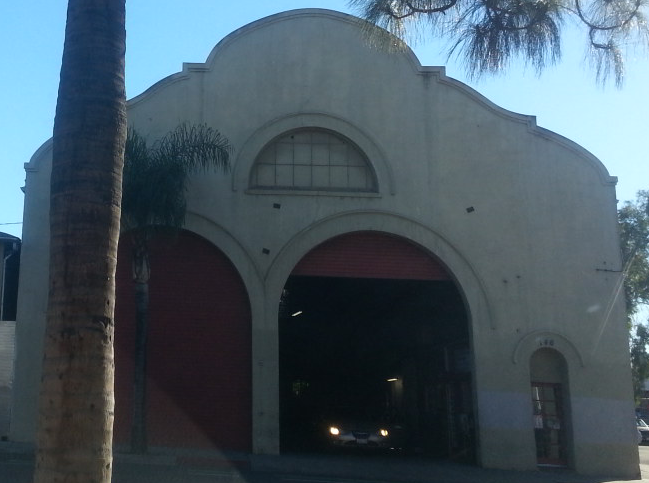

- Location within California Location within the United States
- Location: 746 E. Citrus Ave., Redlands, California
- Coordinates: 34.05527°N 117.17440°W
- Area: less than one acre
- Built by: Taylor Bros. Brick Co.
- Architect: Fisher, John H.
- Architectural style: Mission Revival
- NRHP reference No.: 90002119
- Added to NRHP: January 3, 1991

The Redlands Central Railway Company car barn is a historic car barn located at 746 East Citrus Avenue in Redlands, California, United States. The building was used to house electric railway cars, first for the Redlands Central Railway and later for the Pacific Electric Railway. It is the only extant Pacific Electric car barn, and one of only two trolley barns remaining in Southern California.

== History ==
The Redlands Central Railway was formed in 1907 by Henry and John H. Fisher, and its car barn was built the same year; it served a line along Citrus and Brookside Avenues in Redlands. The company merged with the San Bernardino Valley Traction Company (SBVT) in 1908, and its car barn became a secondary barn for the consolidated system. In 1911, the SBVT merged into the Pacific Electric (PE) Railway, Southern California's sprawling electric streetcar network. The car barn was used intermittently by the Pacific Electric for the next two decades; Pacific Electric's Redlands Line mainly used the larger SBVT barn. In 1926, the barn was officially no longer being used. It went out of service when the Citrus and Brookside Avenue line was converted to bus service.

PE and its successors leased the barn to various businesses until its sale in 1987. The city of Redlands purchased the barn to save it from demolition, but could not afford renovations. The building was added to the National Register of Historic Places on January 3, 1991. In 1994, the barn was sold by the city. It now houses an automobile repair shop; the shop purchased the barn in 1999.

== See also ==
- Streetcars in Redlands
