= George W. Hoover =

American land developer of Hollywood

George W. Hoover was an American land developer, who was a pioneer in Hollywood, California.

Hoover was born in Lancaster, Pennsylvania, and, when grown, he went to Nebraska and took up farming on a government land claim. He then moved to York, Pennsylvania, where he opened a soap factory at College Avenue and Newberry Street. In the flood of 1889, the building was destroyed and Hoover became almost penniless. He then began a carriage business on North George Street, the site of the former York Railway freight station, where he "made his fortune."

In York, he lived at 119 North George Street. His shop was at 15-17 East Philadelphia Street, later occupied by the Dispatch Publishing Company.

== Hollywood ==
Hoover moved to Hollywood, California, in 1899, 1900, or 1901 and purchased a 6.5-acre ranch on Hollywood Boulevard between Vine Street and Ivar Street "for a consideration of a little over $7,000." His home address became 6307 Hollywood Boulevard, on the northwest corner of Hollywood and Vine.

In 1903 he was vice president of the Santa Ana Tin Mining Co. By 1904 he had become president of the Bank of Hollywood.

In 1904 he joined with others to form a company called Hotel Hollywood, to enlarge an existing building "and refurnish it throughout." In that same year he became a member of the first jury ever to be impaneled in the city of Hollywood when a man named J.W. Jeals was tried for selling liquor in violation of a city ordinance, Hollywood being a "dry" jurisdiction at the time. The jury could not decide, and the defendant was held over for another trial.

He was elected Hollywood's first city treasurer before the city was merged with Los Angeles in 1910.

== Death ==
Hoover died on January 28, 1924, in his home. He was survived by his wife, Mary C.; two daughters, Mrs. Harry E. Rodenhaus of Pasadena, California, and Mary (Mrs. George or John S.) Walker of Hollywood, and two sons, George W. Jr. and Frank K., both of Hollywood.

A funeral service was conducted on February 2, 1924, in the Strother and Dayton chapel, 6240 Hollywood Boulevard, with the Rev. S.T. Westhaven officiating. Interment followed in the Hollywood Cemetery mausoleum.

His estate was divided equally among his widow and children, the state inheritance tax being a "large" one of $16,319. His property at Hollywood and Vine was sold to Carl Laemmle for $325,000.
