= Hollywood Art Center School Estate =

Historic estate in Hollywood, California. U.S.

Hollywood Art Center School
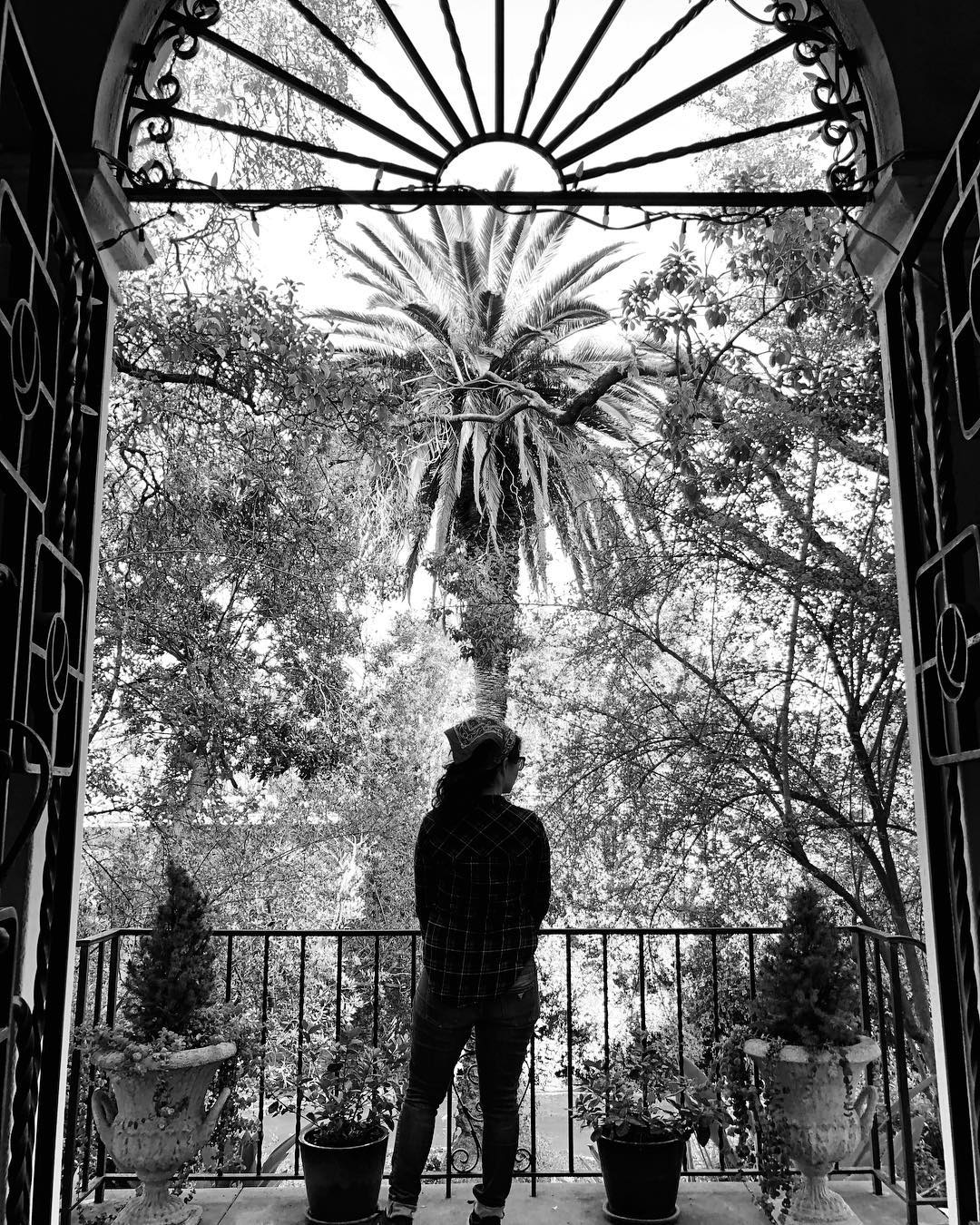
- Elizabeth Lovins, granddaughter of Hollywood Art Center School’s founders, outside the estate’s entrance in 2021
- Interactive map of the Hollywood Art Center School area

General information
- Type: Residential
- Architectural style: Mission Revival
- Location: 2025-2027 North Highland Avenue and 2000-2026 North Glencoe Way, Hollywood, Los Angeles, California, U.S.
- Coordinates: 34°06′26″N 118°20′18″W
- Completed: 1904

Design and construction
- Architects: Dennis & Farwell

Los Angeles Historic-Cultural Monument
- Designated: January 14, 2020
- Reference no.: 1202

Hollywood Art Center School is a historic estate located at 2025-2027 North Highland Avenue and 2000-2026 North Glencoe Way in Hollywood, Los Angeles, California. It was declared Los Angeles Historic-Cultural Monument No. 1202 in 2020.

== Description ==
Hollywood Art Center School is a 3-acre (12,000 m^{2}) Mission Revival hillside estate that consists of four buildings: a main house, carriage house, guest house, and studio, the latter of which was originally a garage. Each building is connected by pathways, courtyards, and paved driveways. The property is extensively landscaped and features wrought iron gates, a tiled fountain, an artificial waterfall, a lily pond, and a 100-seat amphitheater that overlooks the Hollywood Sign.

The main house is two stories, irregular in plan, and made of wood with textured stucco cladding. The first story is topped by a flat roof with a parapet, while the second story features a hipped roof with green glazed terracotta tiles. The entrance, east-facing and part of an asymmetrical façade, is recessed behind tripartite arched openings, and the building also features multi-lite casement windows and tripartite arched windows. The interior is arranged around an octagonal atrium enclosed in stain glass and features a Batchelder fountain and fireplace, wrought iron detailing, and built in cabinetry.

The carriage house, guest house, and studio are all one-story and, like the main house, made of wood with stucco cladding and feature a flat roof with a parapet.

== History ==
The estate that would become Hollywood Art Center School was originally designed for Otto Classen by Dennis & Farwell, the architectural duo responsible for the nearby Cline Residence, James R. Toberman House, and Magic Castle. It was built in 1904. Original lore had it that this estate was built by William Randolph Hearst for Marion Davies, but this was found to be untrue by architectural historian Heather Goers.

An artist studio was added to the estate in 1911. A living roof was added to the main house and the kitchen and bathrooms were modified in 1919. A garage and guest house were added in 1920 and a screened patio and another garage were added in 1927. The residence was converted to a hotel in 1944. Additionally, Bertha Barker, widow of Barker Bros. owner OJ Barker, took ownership of the estate by 1919.

The estate was purchased by Henry and Mona Lue Lovins, founders of Hollywood Art Center School, in 1947. The school, Los Angeles’s first independent art school, was founded as the Southwest Academy of Art in the Hamburgers Department Store Building in downtown Los Angeles in 1912. The school relaunched as the Hollywood Art Center School in 1930, where it had several Hollywood locations, including this property once it was purchased. This property was the school’s sole location from 1960 to its closure in 2000.

After Hollywood Art Center School’s closure, the estate reverted to a private residence. Iron gates were installed and the original colonnade was replaced in 2003.

The estate sold for $6.5 million in 2017 ($8.54 million in 2025). Oppenheim Group listed it for sale for $7 million in 2024 ($7.18 million in 2025).

=== Historic designation ===
Hollywood Art Center School was declared Los Angeles Historic-Cultural Monument No. 1202 on January 14, 2020. The estate was found to exemplify “significant contributions to the broad cultural, economic or social history of the nation, state, city or community” due to its association with early Southern California and Hollywood art movements. However, the estate was not found to be an excellent example of its architectural style, nor was it found to be a notable work of a master architect, due to its overall lack of uniqueness as well as the extensive alterations that removed original features from the property. The building was also not recognized for its association with the lives of historic personnel, the evaluators stating that "while some of the artists among the Hollywood Art Center School faculty may be considered historic personages, the information submitted in the application did not support a finding that the property met this designation criterion."
