= Janes House =

Historic house in Los Angeles, California, U.S.

- U.S. Historic district – Contributing property
- Los Angeles Historic-Cultural Monument
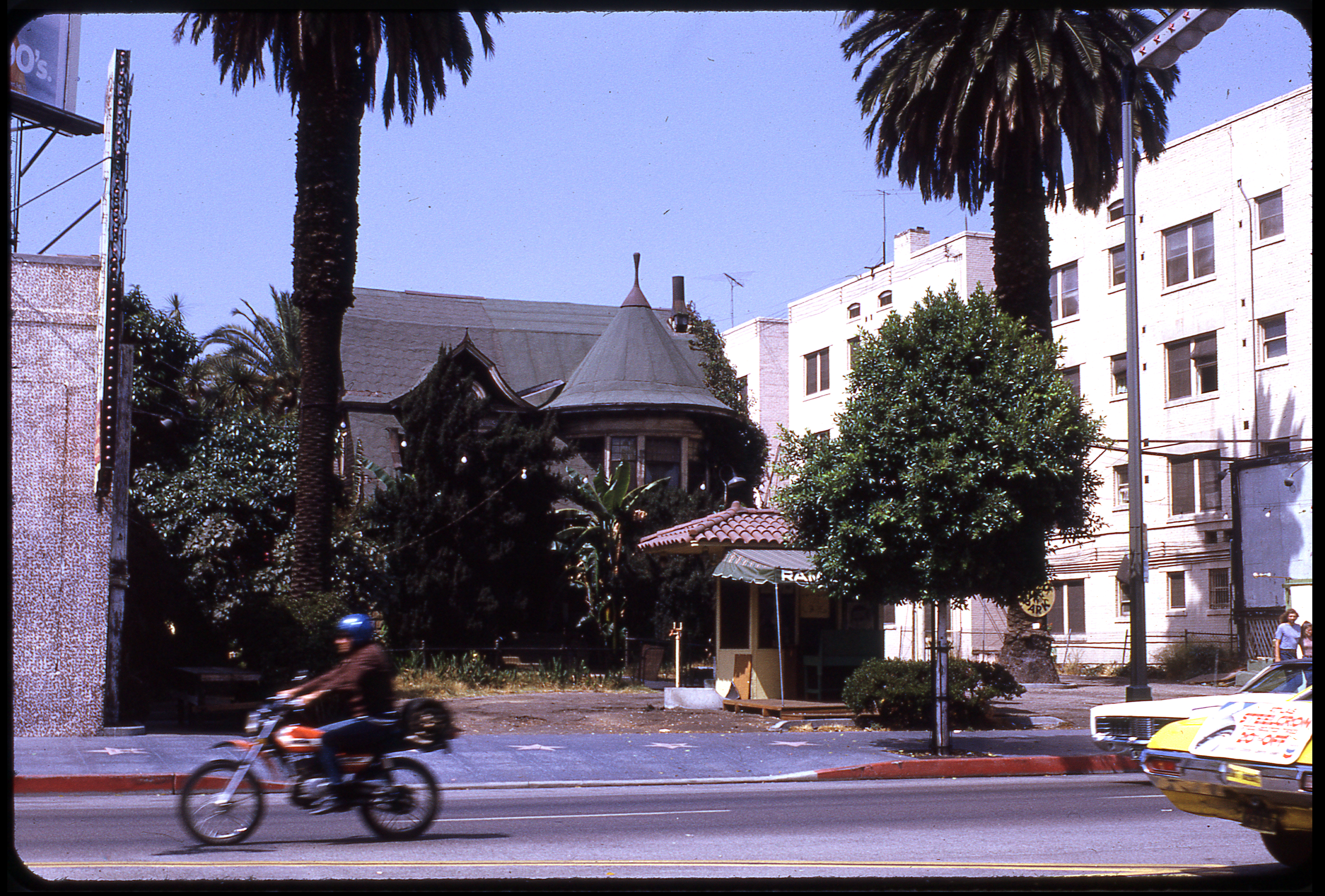
- Janes House in 1973

- Location within the Los Angeles metropolitan area
- Location: 1727 Hudson Avenue, Hollywood, California
- Coordinates: 34.1023°N 118.3324°W
- Built: 1903
- Architect: Lyman Farwell; Oliver Perry Dennis
- Architectural style: Queen Anne Victorian
- Part of: Hollywood Boulevard Commercial and Entertainment District (ID85000704)
- LAHCM No.: 227

Significant dates
- Designated CP: April 4, 1985
- Designated LAHCM: April 3, 1980

Janes House, also known as Janes Residence, is a historic home at 1727 Hudson Avenue, on the corner of Hudson Avenue and Hollywood Boulevard, in Hollywood, California. The house predates the area's existing commercial development and is the boulevard's only remaining residential structure.

== History ==
=== Beginnings ===
Janes House was originally developed at 6541 Hollywood Blvd by H. J. Whitley and built in 1903 by architectural firm Dennis and Farwell, the same firm responsible for the nearby Lane House. The Janes family bought the house for $10,000 ($358,333 in 2025) the year it was built, and moved in two years later.

In 1911, the Janes family opened a kindergarten with fifteen students in their home, soon expanding to K-8th grade. They named the school The Misses Janes School of Hollywood. More than 1000 kids attended in the fifteen years the school was in existence, including the children of Charlie Chaplin, Jesse Lasky, Douglas Fairbanks Sr., Cecil B. DeMille, Jack Holt, Thomas Ince, and Wallace and Noah Beery.

The school closed in 1926, at which point the family set up a gas pump as a new source of income, naming themselves Janes Auto Service Station. Later, the house's yard was turned into a parking lot.

=== Preservation and restoration ===
In 1980, Hollywood Heritage formed to identify and save historic structures in Hollywood, with Janes House being their first effort. That same year, Janes House was designated Los Angeles Historic-Cultural Monument No. 227.

In 1985, the Hollywood Boulevard Commercial and Entertainment District was added to the National Register of Historic Places, with Janes Residence listed as a contributing property in the district. The listing noted that Janes Residence had an unaltered yet dilapidated interior and an intact exterior.

In 1984, Janes House was sold to a developer for $600,000 ($1.86 million in 2025). In 1985, the house was moved to the back of its lot, changing its address to 1727 Hudson Avenue, and a 14,000 sq ft mini mall named Janes Square was built in front. The house itself underwent several renovations, becoming Hollywood's official visitor information center in 1986, a restaurant named Memphis in 2006 and another restaurant named Janes House in 2009, and the 1920s-themed speakeasy No Vacancy in 2013.

== Architecture ==
Jane House predates Hollywood's existing commercial development and is Hollywood Boulevard's only remaining residential structure. The house is made of wood, was designed in the Queen Anne Victorian style, and features a conical bay with a turreted roof, a hewn stone porch, bevelled glass windows, and a shingled exterior.

== See also ==
- List of Los Angeles Historic-Cultural Monuments in Hollywood
- List of contributing properties in the Hollywood Boulevard Commercial and Entertainment District
