= Redlands Country Club =

Historic private country club in California

- Interactive map of Redlands Country Club
- 34°01′28″N 117°09′00″W

Club information
- Location: Redlands, California
- Established: 1896
- Type: Private, member-owned
- Total holes: 18
- Website: redlandscountryclub.com
- Designed by: Alister MacKenzie, Tom Bendelow, Ray Hornby (1927 redesign); Todd Eckenrode (2016 restoration)
- Par: 70
- Length: 6,211 yards
- Course rating: 70.2
- Slope rating: 128

The Redlands Country Club is a private, member-owned golf and country club located in Redlands, California. Founded on November 21, 1896, it is recognized as the oldest member-owned country club in the western United States. The 18-hole championship course features design contributions from legendary golf course architect Alister MacKenzie.

Redlands Country Club

== History ==
=== Founding and early years (1896–1926) ===
The club was conceived in late 1896 when a group of 30 local businessmen gathered at the Casa Loma Hotel in Redlands to organize a regional golf club. On November 21, 1896, the club was officially chartered, and by early 1897, 25 foundational members purchased approximately 80 acres of rolling citrus land in southern Redlands area. The original golf course was a primitive 9-hole routing. The club gained regional and national recognition early on, joining the Southern California Golf Association (SCGA) in 1899 and the United States Golf Association (USGA) in 1909.

=== The 1927 MacKenzie redesign ===
A major turning point for the facility occurred in 1927, when the club acquired additional acreage to expand into a full 18-hole, par-70 layout utilizing grass turf. The club retained prominent Scottish golf course architect Alister MacKenzie—who later designed Augusta National Golf Club and Cypress Point Club—to consult on the layout. Working alongside designers Tom Bendelow and Ray Hornby, MacKenzie integrated the course into the natural topography of the Redlands hills. Remnants of the original 1896 sand-green complexes remain preserved as historical landmarks across the modern property.

=== Mid-century challenges and fires ===
The club remained operational through the Great Depression and both World Wars, though it faced significant physical catastrophes mid-century. The original clubhouse was completely destroyed by a fire in 1942. To prevent the club from dissolving during World War II, dedicated members purchased the property in 1943 to preserve its equity status, constructing a replacement clubhouse in 1948. A second major fire destroyed the second clubhouse facility in 1961. The membership rallied to rebuild once more, opening the modern third iteration of the clubhouse structure in 1963.

=== Modern era and restoration (2016–present) ===
In 2016, the Redlands Country Club commissioned golf architect Todd Eckenrode and Origins Golf Design to initiate a multi-year course restoration project. The master plan focused on removing decades of invasive tree overgrowth, restoring MacKenzie's signature bunker aesthetics, and reopening panoramic vistas of the surrounding San Bernardino Mountains. The course serves as the home competitive facility for the University of Redlands Bulldogs golf program as well as local high school teams.

== Course layout ==
The present-day course is a par-70 layout measuring 6,211 yards from the championship tee. It features a course rating of 70.2 and a slope rating of 128. The course architecture relies on sharp elevation changes, narrow fairways, and small, undulating greens typical of the golden age of golf design.

== Scorecard ==
Redlands Country Club
| Tee | Rating/Slope | 1 | 2 | 3 | 4 | 5 | 6 | 7 | 8 | 9 | Out | 10 | 11 | 12 | 13 | 14 | 15 | 16 | 17 | 18 | In | Total |
| Par | Men's | 4 | 4 | 3 | 4 | 3 | 5 | 4 | 4 | 4 | 35 | 4 | 3 | 4 | 4 | 4 | 3 | 5 | 4 | 5 | 36 | 71 |
| White | 70.7/126 | 317 | 418 | 160 | 345 | 171 | 510 | 403 | 297 | 418 | 3039 | 129 | 345 | 337 | 162 | 341 | 471 | 373 | 326 | 427 | 2911 | 5950 |
| Yellow | 61.6/104 | 208 | 257 | 130 | 260 | 115 | 350 | 272 | 271 | 266 | 2129 | 107 | 265 | 270 | 107 | 270 | 353 | 244 | 249 | 310 | 2175 | 4304 |
| Par | Women's | 4 | 5 | 3 | 4 | 3 | 5 | 4 | 4 | 4 | 36 | 3 | 4 | 4 | 3 | 4 | 5 | 4 | 4 | 5 | 36 | 72 |
| Red | 67.6/118 | 311 | 406 | 150 | 338 | 147 | 494 | 345 | 271 | 411 | 2873 | 115 | 288 | 306 | 139 | 326 | 466 | 363 | 311 | 426 | 2740 | 5613 |
