= Morey Mansion =

- Interactive map of the Morey Mansion area

General information
- Architectural style: Victorian
- Location: 190 Terracina Blvd; Redlands, California 92373
- Coordinates: 34.038816°N 117.208012°W
- Completed: 1890
- Renovated: 2000
- Cost: $20,000
- Client: David Morey

Technical details
- Floor count: 3
- Floor area: 4,800 square feet (450 m^{2})

Design and construction
- Architect: Jerome Seymour

Morey Mansion is an 1890 Victorian house in Redlands, California, United States.

== History ==
The house was built in 1890 by early Redlands residents David and Sarah Morey for $20,000, profits from the sale of their citrus nursery. Following the Moreys' deaths in 1901, the house's second owners were Willard R. and Nancy Cheney, the brother and sister-in-law of Helen Cheney Kimberly, who was the wife of one of the founders of Kimberly-Clark Corporation. In the 1940s, it was reportedly owned by actress Carole Lombard's uncle and left to her in his will, but she died before she could take ownership. Shortly after, the mansion was purchased by Willard L. and Florence Wiseman, and then sold in 1969 to Curtiss and Phyllis Allen. The Allens owned it during the 1970s. Mr. Allen had seen the house as a young boy while in Redlands; he told someone that he was going to own that house one day. A friend told him it was for sale and Mr. Allen purchased it immediately.

The house was featured in the film Talk About a Stranger (1952) as the house of the character Dr. Paul Mahler, alias Matlock.

The mansion opened as the first bed and breakfast in Redlands in 1985 under then-owners Carl Ljungquist and Gary Conway. The house was purchased by Janet Cosgrove in 1998, who oversaw renovation work to the building before reopening it as a bed and breakfast in 2006. In 2010, Sara and Bill Taylor bought the mansion for sole use as their private residence. In 2012 the house went into foreclosure. In January 2014, ownership was returned to Janet Cosgrove.

== Gallery ==
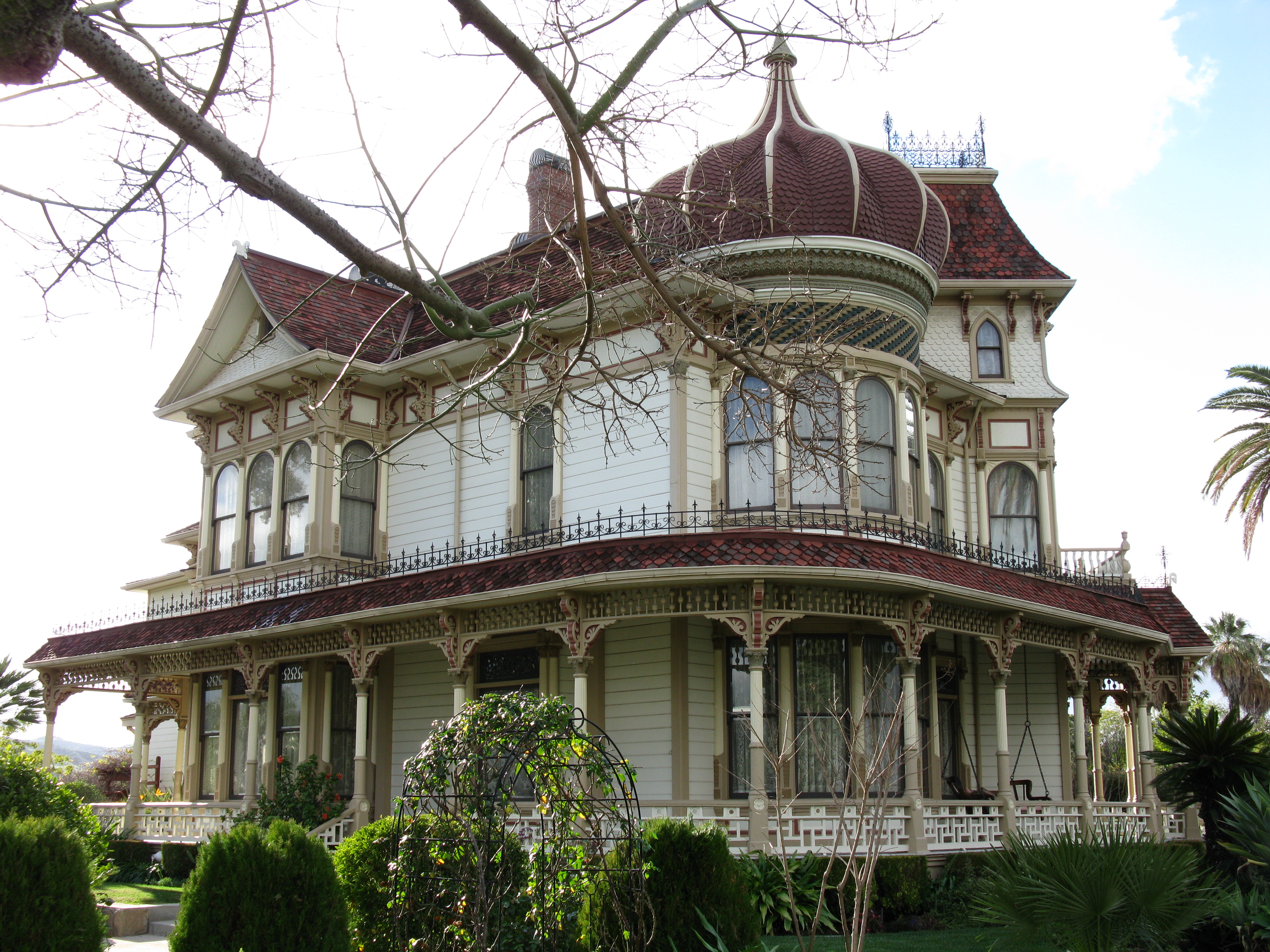
Morey Mansion viewed from the southeast.

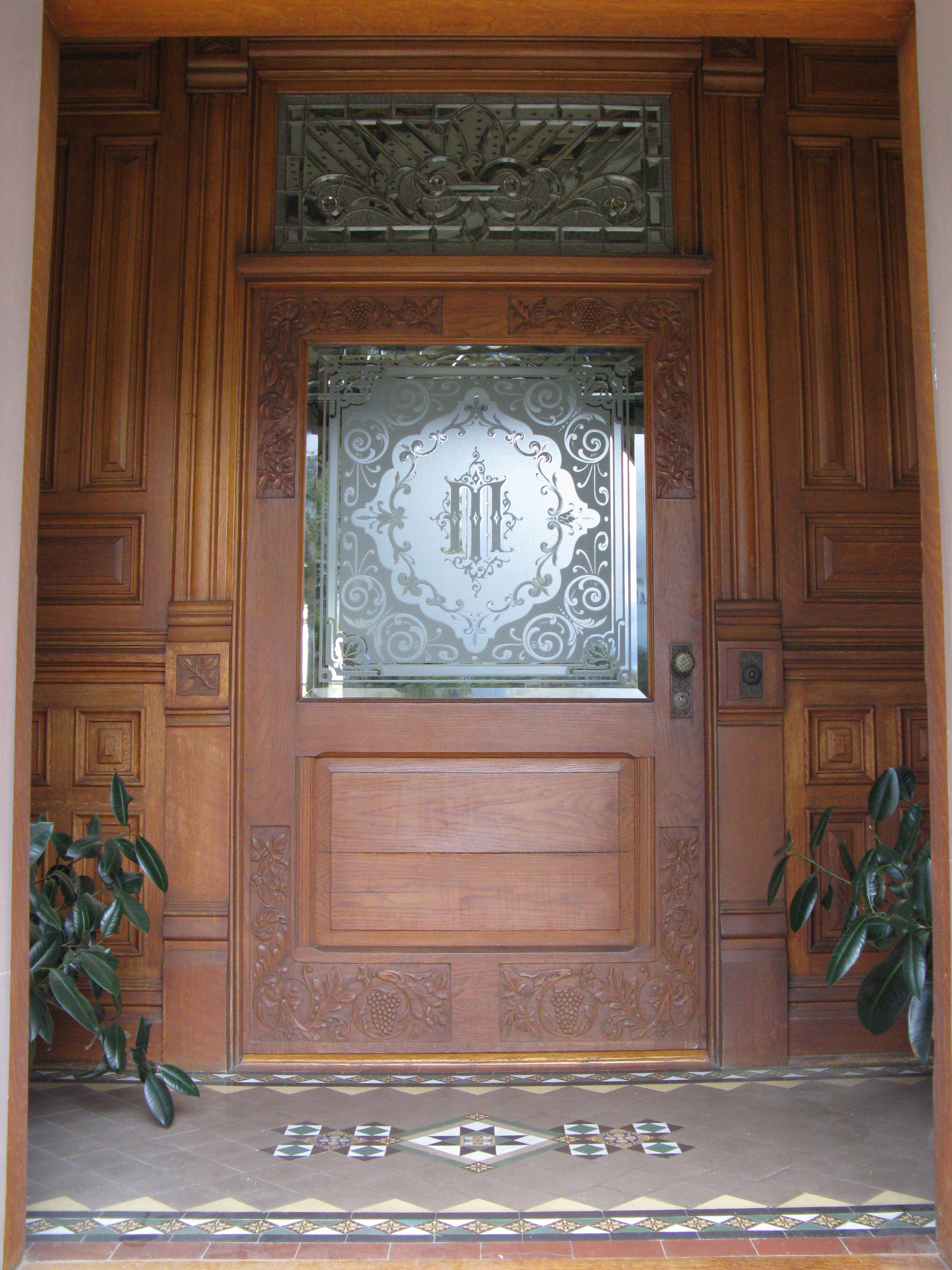
Vestibule and front door.

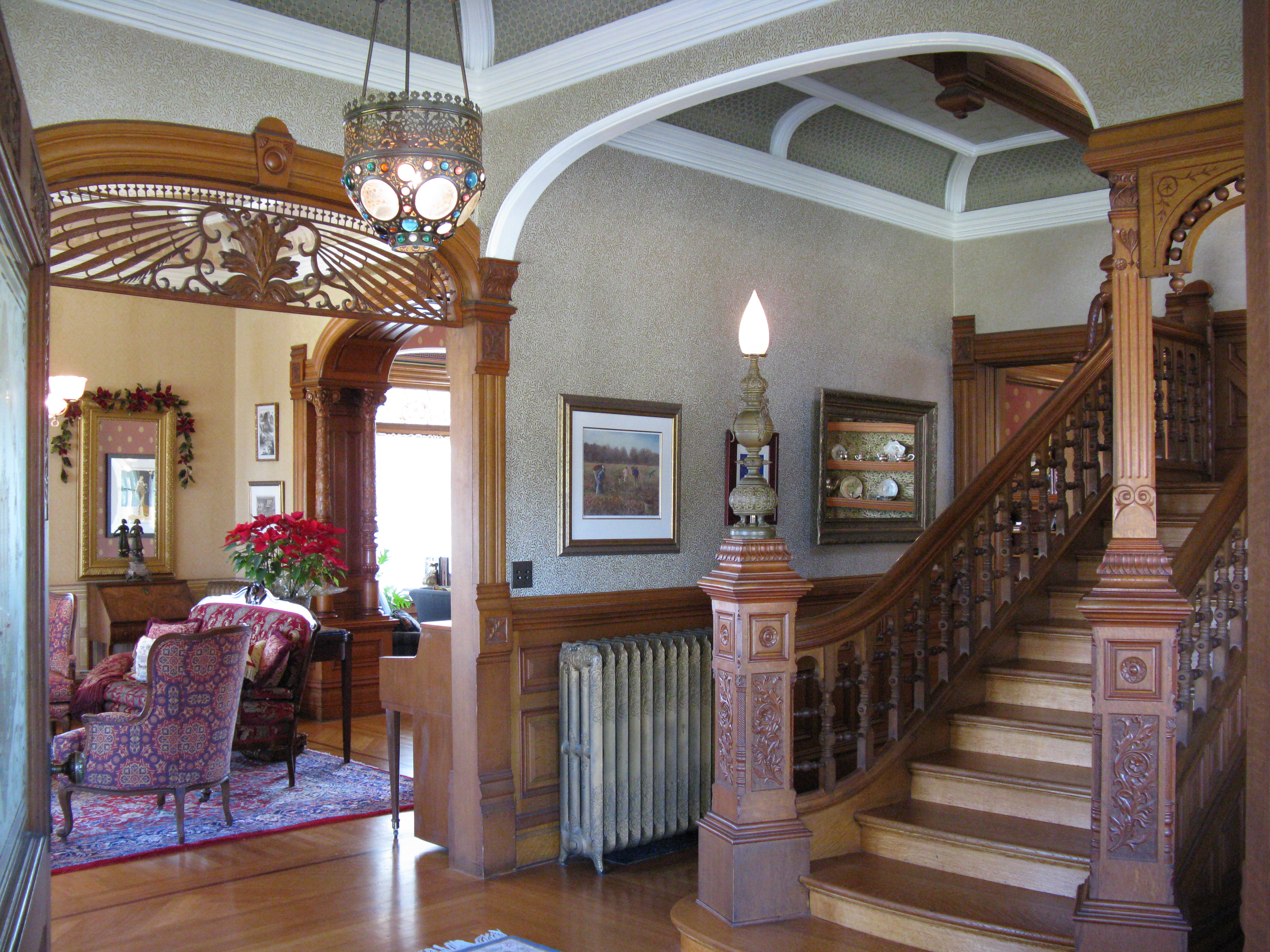
Foyer.

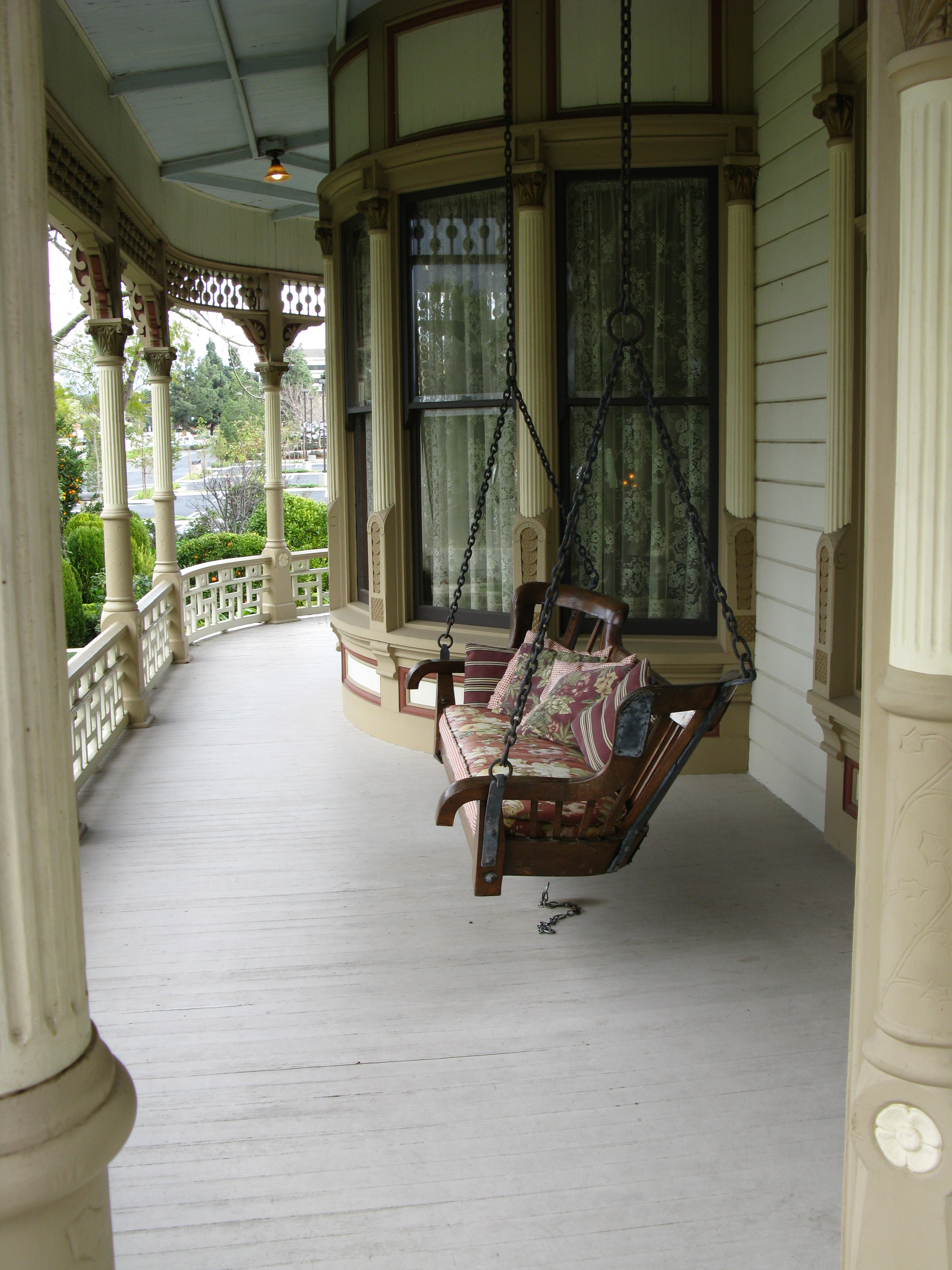
Front porch and swing.

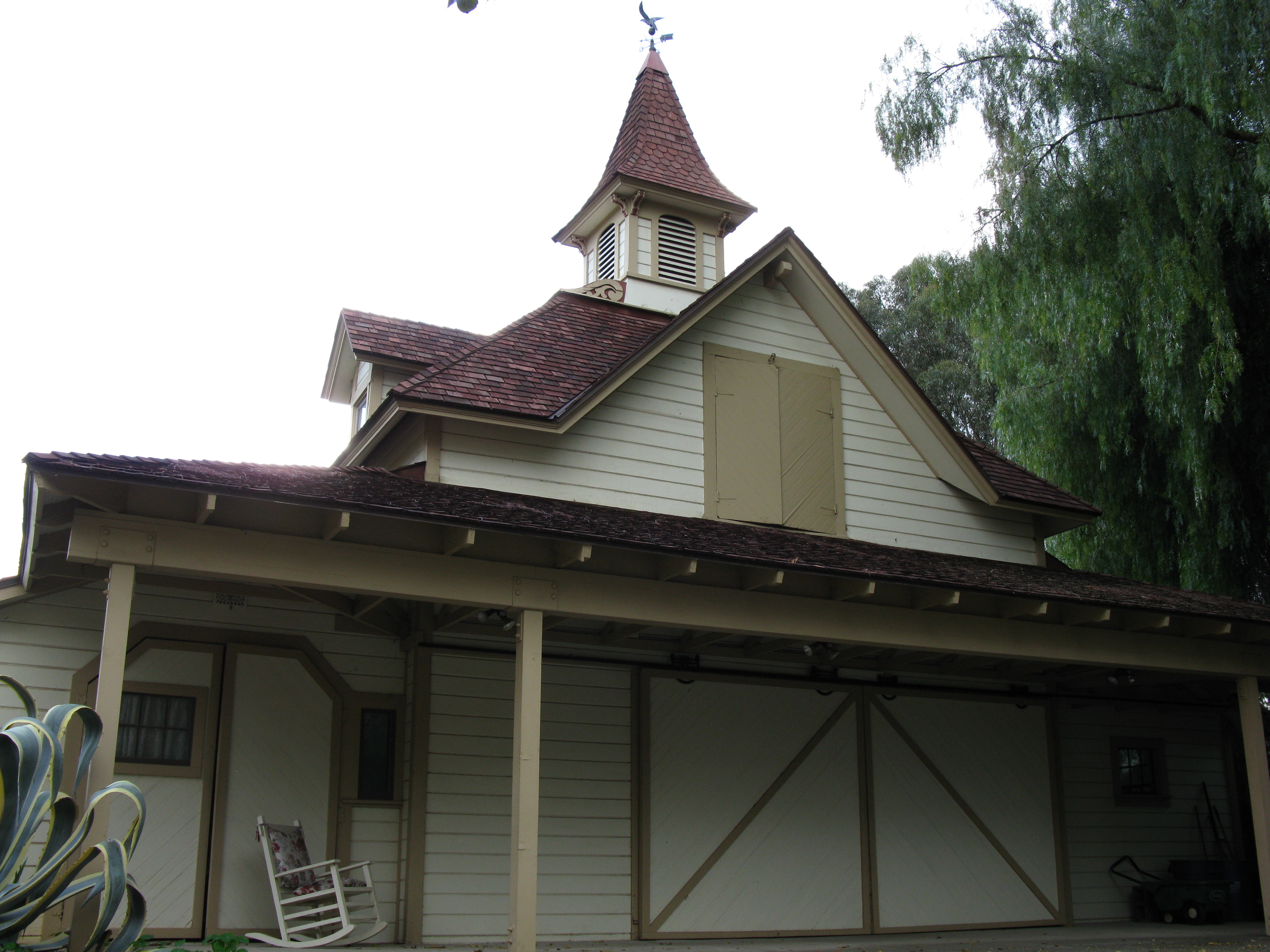
Carriage house.

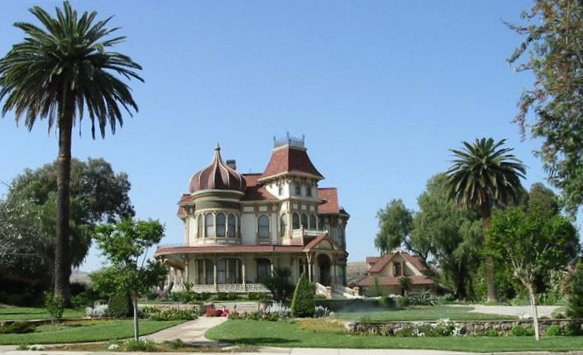
Side angle of the house
