= Dolphin Interconnect Solutions =

Manufacturer of high speed data communication systems

- Traded as: OSE: DOLP
- Founded: 1989; 37 years ago
- Headquarters: Oslo, Norway
- Website: www.dolphinics.com

Dolphin Interconnect Solutions is a privately held manufacturer of high-speed and low latency data communication systems headquartered in Oslo, Norway and Dallas, Texas USA.

The technology of Dolphin was based on development work at Norsk Data during the late 1980s. Dolphin Interconnect Solutions was founded in 1992 as a spin-off from Dolphin Server Technology which was, in turn, a spin-off from Norsk Data in 1989. Dolphin Interconnect Solutions develops technology for low latency and high-speed communication between servers and/or embedded computer systems.

== History ==
Dolphin Server Technology emerged from Norsk Data, "a formerly flourishing Norwegian minicomputer maker", with one of its aims to build a business developing systems based on the Motorola 88000 architecture, these being adopted by Norsk Data as the new company's initial customer, with the intention of gradually reducing Norsk Data's stake to less than 50 percent and thus gradually increasing the new company's independence. Dolphin was established as a consequence of the restructuring of Norsk Data in 1988, the separation of product development from other aspects of the parent company's business, and the transfer of 125 employees from Norsk Data's development divisions. Another initial activity was to develop a Unix system for Norsk Data's existing ND-5000 range.

Following an initial product announcement in late 1989, by April 1990, Dolphin Server Technology had started shipping products in its Triton 88 series, based on the Motorola 88000 processor family, with these systems supporting up to four processors. Compliant with the 88open Consortium's standards, the Triton 88 series ran a Unix product developed by UniSoft, providing binary compatibility with contemporary 88000-based systems. Dolphin offered these products through value-added resellers in European, North American, and South American markets, also cultivating business with original equipment manufacturers, resulting in the Triton 88 models appearing "under several different brand names" worldwide.

Having announced plans for an emitter-coupled logic (ECL) version of the Motorola 88000, projected to run at 125 MHz, executing up to eight instructions in parallel, and delivering a peak performance of 1000 MIPS, Dolphin Server Technology participated in the development and standardization of Scalable Coherent Interface (SCI) technology, delivering the first prototype in 1992 for an implementation of the base SCI standard as a gate array fabricated by Vitesse Semiconductor. A CMOS implementation was demonstrated in 1994 in association with LSI Logic.

They were among the pioneers in the development and commercialization of the Scalable Coherent Interface (SCI) technology. SCI was one of the earliest high-speed interconnect technologies designed to enable multiprocessing and data sharing across a wide area, significantly enhancing the performance of clustered computing environments. This innovation helped set the stage for the development of modern high-performance computing networks.

The company had announced its plans for the ECL variant of the 88000, named Orion and developed in conjunction with Motorola, in December 1989. This processor, employing a technique called "instruction folding" originating from research done within Norsk Data, involved "a mutual exchange of patented technology" between the companies. It was hoped that Orion would ship in the first half of 1992. Initially mentioned in Norsk Data's 1988 annual report, Orion was also the subject of a project under the auspices of the EUREKA programme in association with Siemens and NTNU, "building on four different technologies from Siemens AG, Motorola Inc., National Semiconductor Ltd. and Dolphin".

Orion was described in 1990 as a design based on "a new idea for parallel execution of instructions", amenable to supporting any RISC instruction set but based initially on Motorola's 88000 instruction set, that would be implemented using ECL technology from National Semiconductor. The implementation would involve Dolphin's "multichip" modules, holding up to 200 large-scale integrated circuits and capable of dissipating up to 700 W of heat. Simulations of the processor architecture indicated a 21-fold speed-up over the company's Triton 88 product, with a projected Dhrystone rating equivalent to around 467 VAX MIPS, accompanied by suggestions of further performance gains through improvements in compiler technology. With delivery of the Orion chipset anticipated during 1991, product shipments were anticipated during 1992.

Dolphin's ECL variant had, however, reportedly been abandoned already in early 1991 due to unspecified difficulties, with the company refocusing its Orion efforts on "Motorola's post-88110, 100MHz BiCMOS technology". The company planned to deliver an "interim Triton SCI system" early in 1992, combining elements of Orion with the Motorola 88110, awaiting SCI's ratification by the IEEE before committing to a final product. Meanwhile, Dolphin planned enhancements to its Triton88 product, including a plug-in board with up to five 88000 processors and support for Unix System V Release 4. The company also introduced a low-end Triton88 system to its range in September 1991, priced just below £10,000.

In 1993, Dolphin, described as a vendor of "RISC-based UNIX multiprocessor servers" specializing in solutions for the government and banking, announced a deal with NeXT to resell NeXT computer products and to license NeXT's software technology. Ultimately, Dolphin "abandoned the server market entirely", the SCI product business itself being spun out as Dolphin Interconnect Solutions prior to TBK Telematikk's acquisition of Dolphin Server Technology in 1994. The acquired business was reoriented, becoming "a subsidiary focusing on support" within TBK, itself an organisation wholly owned by the Norwegian telecommunications monopoly that would later become Telenor.

== Products ==
Dolphin started out continuing the development of a line of SCI products from Norsk Data, by implementing customer-specific technology, as well as providing Peripheral Component Interconnect (PCI) and later PCIe boards for commodity and high-performance computing (HPC) systems. Sun Microsystems agreed to re-sell Dolphin's SCI interfaces for the SBus in 1996. Dolphin SCI products are available under the Dolphin Express SCI label.

The StarFabric product line was added through the acquisition of StarGen Inc. in early 2007. StarGen shareholders received about 22% of the combined company. StarGen, which became the US subsidiary of Dolphin, had been based in Marlborough, Massachusetts, and led by Tim Miller. StarFabric provides a PCI-based interconnect running over standard Ethernet Category 5 cables. Similarly, the Dolphin Express DX product line introduced in 2006 was also acquired from StarGen. DX was based on the Advanced Switching Interconnect (ASI) standard and implements a PCI Express Gen1 switched-topology technology supporting both host to host communication and host to IO expansion over an individual cable connection. A company called Numascale was spun out of Dolphin in 2008, referring to the concept of non-uniform memory access (NUMA).

The Dolphin Express IX product line introduced in 2010 is based on PCIe Gen2 and Gen3 integrated circuits ("chips") from Integrated Device Technology. The Dolphin Express PX product line, introduced in 2016, is based on PCI Express Gen3 chipsets from Broadcom. IX and PX implements a PCIe-native switched-topology technology.

The SISCI application programming interface (API) was developed for the shared memory SCI hardware. With the introduction of the PX, IX, and DX-line of products, the API was expanded to support features like reflective memory, multicast and PCIe peer-to-peer communication.

SuperSockets is a software platform for Dolphin Express providing a low latency, high throughput implementation of the Berkeley sockets and Winsock APIs. It was introduced in 2007.

SmartIO has been used to share GPUs, NVMe drives, and other devices in a PCIe network.
