= Nebula (disambiguation) =

A nebula is a cloud of gas and dust in space.

Nebula may also refer to:

== Arts, entertainment and media ==
=== Fictional entities ===
- Commander Nebula, from the 2000 pilot episode film Buzz Lightyear of Star Command: The Adventure Begins, and
  - from the animated series Buzz Lightyear of Star Command, 2000–2001
- Nebula (character), a 1985 Marvel comic-book character
  - Nebula (Marvel Cinematic Universe), her 2014 film incarnation
- Nebula, an organization in 2001 video game Mega Man Battle Network
- Nebula Wade, from the 1999 film Zenon: Girl of the 21st Century

=== Gaming ===
- Nebula (computer game), a 1984 ZX Spectrum game
- Nebula Device, an open-source realtime 3D game engine

=== Music ===
- Nebula (band), an American rock band
- "Nebula", a song by Incubus on the album S.C.I.E.N.C.E.

=== Literary awards ===
- Nebula Award, United States (since 1966)
- Nebula Awards (China) (since 2010)

=== Periodicals ===
- Nebula (magazine), India, 1935-1936
- Nebula Science Fiction, Scotland, 1952–1959

== Companies ==
- Nebula (company), a defunct cloud computing company
- Nebula Electronics, a DigiTV DVB-T card manufacturer
- Nebula Genomics, a personal genomics company based in San Francisco, US
- Nebula (streaming service), a streaming-on-demand service
- Nebula (spiritual guidance), a company providing astrology, psychic and other services

== Science and technology ==
- Nebula (moth), a moth genus
- Nebulae (computer), a supercomputer in the National Supercomputing Centre in Shenzhen, China
- Nebula (computing platform), a Federal cloud computing platform

== See also ==
- Nebulous (disambiguation)
- Nebulus (disambiguation)
- Planetary nebula
