= Sugon =

Chinese supercomputer manufacturer

Dawning Information Industry Company Limited ("Sugon")
- Native name: 曙光信息產業有限公司
- Type: Public
- Traded as: SSE: 603019
- Industry: High performance computing
- Founded: 1996; 30 years ago
- Headquarters: Sugon Building, Zhongguancun Software Park, Haidian District, Beijing, People's Republic of China
- Area served: China
- Products: Supercomputers, x86 servers
- Website: www.sugon.com

Sugon (Chinese: 曙光; pinyin: Shǔguāng), officially Dawning Information Industry Company Limited, is a supercomputer manufacturer based in the People's Republic of China. The company is a spin-off from research done at the Chinese Academy of Sciences (CAS), and still has close links to it.

== History ==
The company is a development of work done at the Institute of Computer Science, CAS. Under the Chinese government's 863 Program, for the research and development of high technology products, the group launched their first supercomputer (Dawning No. 1) in 1993. In 1996 the group launched the Dawning Company to allow the transfer of research computers into the market.

The company was tasked with developing further supercomputers under the 863 program, which led to the Dawning 5000A and 6000 computers.

The company was listed on the Shanghai Stock Exchange in 2014. CAS still retains stock in the company. Sugon is an investor in technology company GoLaxy.

In May 2025, it was announced that Sugon would merge with Hygon Information Technology. However, this was called off.

=== U.S. sanctions ===
According to the United States Department of Defense the company has links to the People's Liberation Army and, in 2019, Sugon was added to the Bureau of Industry and Security's Entity List due to U.S. national security concerns. In November 2020, the then President of the United States Donald Trump issued an executive order prohibiting any American company or individual from owning shares in companies that the United States Department of Defense has listed as having links to the People's Liberation Army, which included Sugon.

In October 2022, the United States Department of Defense added Sugon to a list of "Chinese military companies" operating in the U.S.

== Supercomputers ==
Dawning was the company's initial name; it was later changed to Sugon. The computers are originally known by their Dawning moniker, but can also use Sugon names in the literature. The model series is as below.

=== Dawning No.1 ===
The first supercomputer created was Dawning No.1 (Shuguang Yihao, 曙光一号), which received state certification in October 1993. This supercomputer achieved 640 million FLOPS, and utilizes Motorola 88100 CPUs (4 total) and 88200 CPUs (8 total), and over 20 were built. The operating system is UNIX V.

=== Dawning 1000 ===
The Dawning 1000 was Sugon's second generation supercomputer, and was originally named Dawning No.2 (Shuguang Erhao, 曙光二号). Dawning 1000 was released in 1995, and received state certification on 11 May 1995. The family of supercomputers could achieve 2.5 GFLOPS. This series of the Dawning family consists of the Dawning 1000A and 1000L.

=== Dawning 2000 ===
The Dawning 2000 was initially released in 1996, and could achieve a peak performance of 4 GFLOPS. A further variant, the Dawning 2000-I, was released in 1998 with a peak performance of 20 GFLOPS. The final model in the series, the Dawning 2000-II, was released in 1999 with a peak performance of 111.7 GFLOPS.

The Dawning 2000 passed state certification on 28 January 2000. The supercomputer model was designed as a cluster to achieve over 100 GLOPS peak performance. The number of CPUs used was greatly increased to 164 in comparison to older models, and like earlier models, the operating system is UNIX.

=== Dawning 3000 ===
The Dawning 3000 passed state certification on 9 March 2001. Like the Dawning 2000, the system was designed as a cluster, and could achieve 400 GFLOPS peak performance. The number of CPU increased to 280, and the system consists of ten 2-meter tall racks, weighing 5 tons total. Power consumption is 25 kW, and one of the tasks it was used for was the part of human genome mapping that China was responsible for.

=== Dawning 4000A ===
The fifth member of the Dawning family, Dawning 4000A, debuted as one of the top 10 fastest supercomputers in the world on the TOP500 list, capable of 806.1 billion FLOPS. The system, at the Shanghai Supercomputer Center, utilizes over 2,560 AMD Opteron processors, and can reach speeds of 8 teraflops.

=== Dawning 5000 ===
The Dawning 5000 series was initially planned to use indigenous Loongson processors. However Shanghai Supercomputer Center required Microsoft Windows support whereas Loongson only ran under Linux.

The resulting Dawning 5000A uses 7,680 1.9 GHz AMD Opteron Quad-core processors, resulting in 30,720 cores, with an Infiniband interconnecting network. The computer occupies an area of 75 square meters and the power consumption is 700 kW. The supercomputer is capable of 180 teraflops and received state certification in June 2008.

The Dawning 5000A was ranked 10th in the November 2008 TOP500 list. Additionally at the time, it was also the largest system using Windows HPC Server 2008 for this benchmark. This system is also installed at the Shanghai Supercomputer Center and runs with SUSE Linux Enterprise Server 10.

=== Dawning 6000 ===
The Dawning 6000 was announced in 2011, at 300 TFLOPS, incorporating 3000 8-core Loongson 3B processors at 3.2 GFLOP/W. It is the "first supercomputer made exclusively of Chinese components" and has a projected speed of over a PFLOP (one quadrillion operations per second). For comparison, the fastest supercomputer as of June 2014 runs at 33 PFLOPS. The same announcement said that a petascale supercomputer was under development and that the launch was anticipated in 2012 or 2013.

== See also ==
- Shanghai Supercomputer Center
- Nebulae - Dawning TC3600
