= LUNA =

Personal computer made by OMRON

LUNA is a computer product line of OMRON Tateishi Electric from the late 1980s to the early 1990s. The LUNA is a 20 MHz/m68030 desktop computer. NetBSD has supported the LUNA since 1.4.2, released in 2000.

The later Omron Luna 88K was available in two models: the DT8840 and TD8860 with 1–4 25 MHz 88100 CPUs and 64 MB RAM. The native operating system was CMU Mach 2.5 and Omron UniOS.
