= Beat Communication =

Beat Communication Co., Ltd.
- Type: Public
- Industry: Software
- Founded: 2004
- Founder: Ryo Murai; Masaru Vic Murai
- Headquarters: Tokyo, Japan
- Area served: Global
- Key people: Ryo Murai (Chairman & CEO); Masaru Vic Murai (Board member); Jiro Kokuryo (Advisor)
- Products: Beat Shuffle; Beat Office （Enterprise social networking software）
- Services: Sales Cloud; Service Cloud; Platform; Marketing Cloud

Beat Communication is a Japanese company that supplies software for enterprise social networking services. It has customers such as NTT Data, Canon Marketing Japan Inc., Japanese Consumer's Cooperative Union, All Nippon Airways Trading Co., Ltd. Mitsubishi UFJ Research and Consulting Co., Ltd., ITX Corporation, ITX, Reitaku University, etc.

In 2013, the company acquired the social networking blog site Socialnetworking.jp that started in 2004. In 2014, ITR, Research Company mentioned in the report that Beat Communication is the leading top company in the field of enterprise social networking industry in Japan followed by Microsoft.

The interview with global leaders about “technology and work style” has been picked up on the national media several times. Some of the interviews are Dr. Heizo Takenaka, ex- Minister at Japanese government, Dr. Jiro Kokuryo, chairman of Keio University, Mr. Seiichiro Hino of Microsoft Japan and Mr. Muneyuki Okawa of Salesforce Japan.

== History ==
- 2003: Social graph experiment at KEIO SFC Incubation Village event in Roppongi Hills
- 2004: Beat Communication Co., Ltd. established; World's first internal SNS package launched
- 2005: "Beat Style" (SNS x Q&A package) launched; Provided "@my page" SNS for J:COM internet subscribers
- 2007: "Beat Office" (SNS + Wiki package) and "Eco Style" (world's first eco-system) launched
- 2008: Developed Eco-Volun, a green IT system for OMRON Corporation's global eco-activities
- 2009: "Nexti" SNS implemented at NTT Data wins IT Management Innovation Award; "Eco Style" selected as an excellent case study by Ministry of Economy, Trade and Industry; Invited to speak at World SNS Forum in London
- 2010: "Beat Office English" launched
- 2011: "Beat Shuffle" SNS package launched
- 2013: Featured on "Nikkei CNBC" TV program
- 2015: On-premises provision of "Beat Shuffle" begins; iOS and Android apps for "Beat Shuffle" launched; "Beat Messenger" internal messaging service launched
- 2018: Global customized version of "Beat Shuffle" implemented in enterprises; PC version of "Beat Messenger" released
- 2023: Began sales of cutting-edge AI marketing platform for businesses in the Japanese market

== Business activities ==
- Development and implementation of social networks and community sites
- Planning, development, customization, management, and sales of social software
- ASP and on-premises sales of social software
- Planning and management of social marketing and advertising
- Consulting for messaging services and IoT (Internet of Things)
- Global marketing consulting
- Development of IoT solutions including wearables
- Cross-border EC consulting
- Sales of AI marketing platform products
- Lectures on knowledge management and social networks
