= Digi TV =

Digi TV may refer to

- Digi TV, a Romanian TV service of Digi Communications
- DigiTV, TV hardware by Nebula Electronics
- Digi-TV, an American over the air television network
