= Windows HPC Server 2008 =

Operating system for high performance computing

Windows HPC Server 2008, released by Microsoft on 22 September 2008, is the successor product to Windows Compute Cluster Server 2003. Like WCCS, Windows HPC Server 2008 is designed for high-end applications that require high performance computing clusters (HPC stands for High Performance Computing). This version of the server software is claimed to efficiently scale to thousands of cores. It includes features unique to HPC workloads: a new high-speed NetworkDirect RDMA, highly efficient and scalable cluster management tools, a service-oriented architecture (SOA) job scheduler, an MPI library based on open-source MPICH2, and cluster interoperability through standards such as the High Performance Computing Basic Profile (HPCBP) specification produced by the Open Grid Forum (OGF).

In June 2008, a system built collaboratively with the National Center for Supercomputing Applications (NCSA) and Microsoft ranked #23 on the TOP500 list, a ranking of the world's fastest supercomputers, with a LINPACK score of 68.5 teraflops. The NCSA supercomputer uses both Windows Server HPC and Red Hat Enterprise Linux 4. By November 2011, that ranking had dropped to #253. Since then, all Windows computers have dropped off the TOP500 list, and Linux has replaced all other operating systems on the list.

In the November 2008 rankings, published by TOP500, a Windows HPC system built by the Shanghai Supercomputer Center achieved a peak performance of 180.6 teraflops and was ranked #11 on the list. In June 2015, that was the last Windows machine left on the list (dropped off later) then ranked 436, just barely made the TOP500 (with Windows Azure dropping off earlier).

== Windows HPC Server 2008 R2 ==
Windows HPC Server 2008 R2, also known as Windows Server 2008 R2 HPC Edition (codenamed Windows 7 Server) based on Windows Server 2008 R2, was released on 20 September 2010.

== Windows HPC Pack ==
After Windows HPC Server 2008 R2, Microsoft released HPC Pack 2008 R2 in four flavors: Express, Enterprise, Workstation and Cycle Harvesting. Later it simplified the offer by releasing HPC Pack 2012 that combined capabilities of all four versions of HPC Pack 2008 R2. HPC Pack 2012 can be installed on top of any Windows Server 2012 Standard or Datacenter.

The head node for the HPC-Pack requires Windows Server, however the node computers can be Windows 10 or Windows 11.
