= Motorola Single Board Computers =

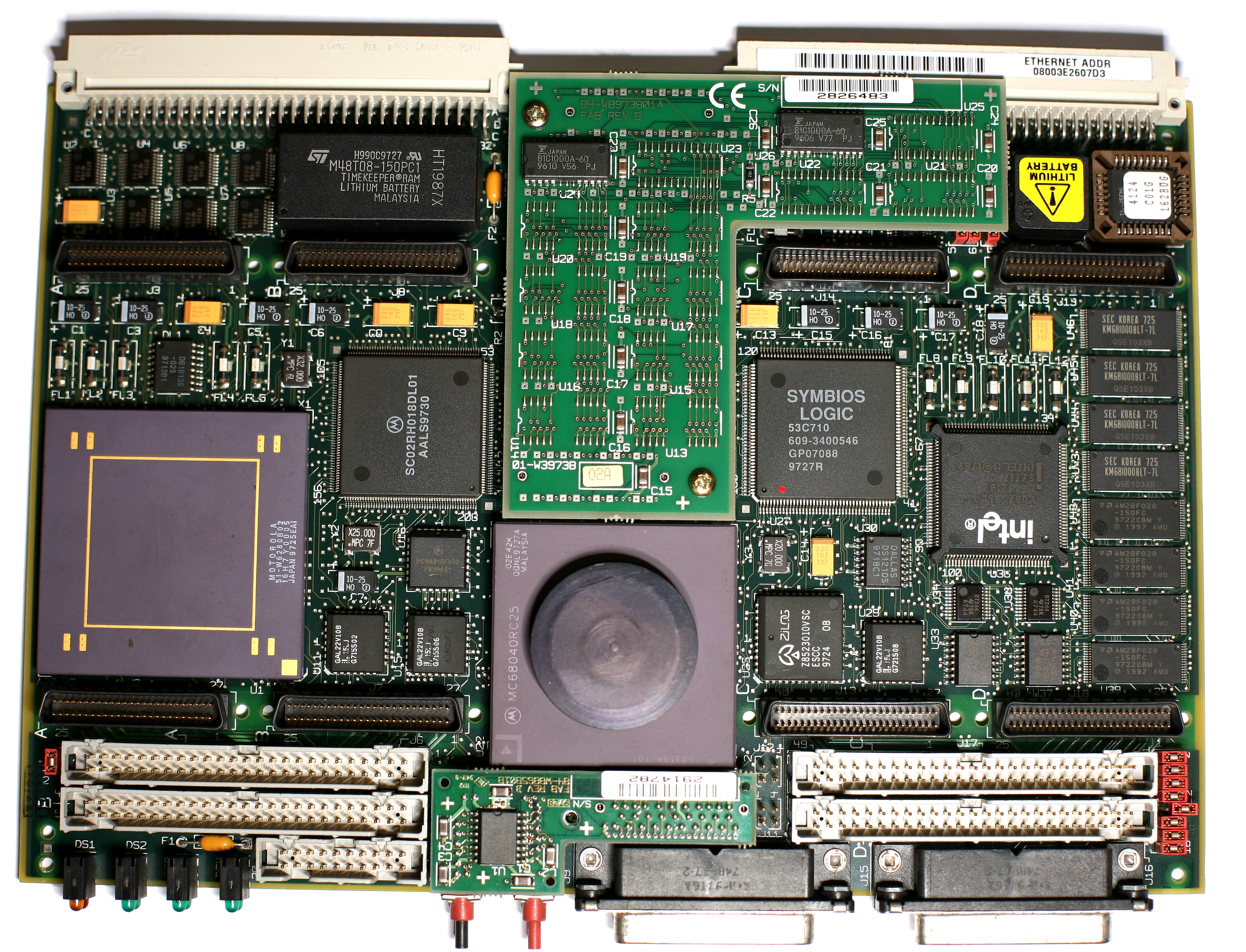
Motorola MVME162

Motorola Single Board Computers is Motorola's production line of computer boards for embedded systems. There are three different lines : mvme68k, mvmeppc and mvme88k. The first version of the board appeared in 1988. Motorola still makes those boards and the last one is MVME3100.

NetBSD supports the MVME147, MVME162, MVME167, MVME172 and MVME177 boards from the mvme68k family, as well as the MVME160x line of mvmeppc boards.

OpenBSD supported the MVME141, MVME147, MVME162, MVME165, MVME167, MVME172, MVME177, MVME180, MVME181, MVME187, MVME188, and MVME197 boards. Both the OpenBSD/mvme68k and OpenBSD/mvme88k ports were discontinued following the 5.5 release.

Board	CPU	CPU Speed	Notes
MVME 110	68000	8 MHz	
MVME 120	68010	10 MHz	68451 MMU
MVME 121	68010	10 MHz	68451 MMU
MVME 122	68010	12.5 MHz	
MVME 123	68010	12.5 MHz	
MVME 133	68020	12.5 or 16.67 MHz	68881 FPU
MVME 134	68020	16.67 MHz	68851 MMU
MVME 141	68030	25 or 33.33 MHz	68882 FPU
MVME 143	68030	16.67 or 25 MHz	
MVME 147	68030	16.67, 25, or 33.33 MHz	
MVME 162	68040	25 MHz	
MVME 165	68040	25 MHz	
MVME 167	68040	25 or 33.33 MHz	
MVME 172	68060	60 or 64 MHz	
MVME 177	68060	50 or 60 MHz	
MVME 181	88000		
MVME 187	88000		
MVME 188	88000		supports one to four 88100 processors and two to eight 88200/88204 cache/MMU ASICs on a mezzanine board called a HYPERmodule
MVME 188A	88000	25 MHz	supports one to four 88100 processors and two to eight 88200/88204 cache/MMU ASICs on a mezzanine board called a HYPERmodule
MVME 197LE	88110		Similar to MVME 187 with 88110 processor
MVME 197SP	88110		
MVME 197DP	88110		dual processor variant of MVME 197SP
MVME 1603	PowerPC 603		
MVME 1604	PowerPC 604		
MVME 2301	PowerPC 603		
MVME 2305	PowerPC 604		
MVME 2700	PowerPC MPC750	233, 266, or 366 MHz	
MVME 3100	PowerPC MPC8540		
MVME 3604	PowerPC 604	300 or 400 MHz	
MVME 4100	PowerPC MPC8548E		
MVME 4604	PowerPC 604	300 or 400 MHz	dual processor variant of MVME 3604
MVME 5100	PowerPC MPC750/MPC755/MPC7410		
MVME 5500	PowerPC MPC7457		
MVME 6100	PowerPC MPC7457		
MVME 7100	PowerPC MPC864xD		
