= National Supercomputer Center in Guangzhou =

Supercomputer site in Guangzhou, China

- 国家超级计算广州中心

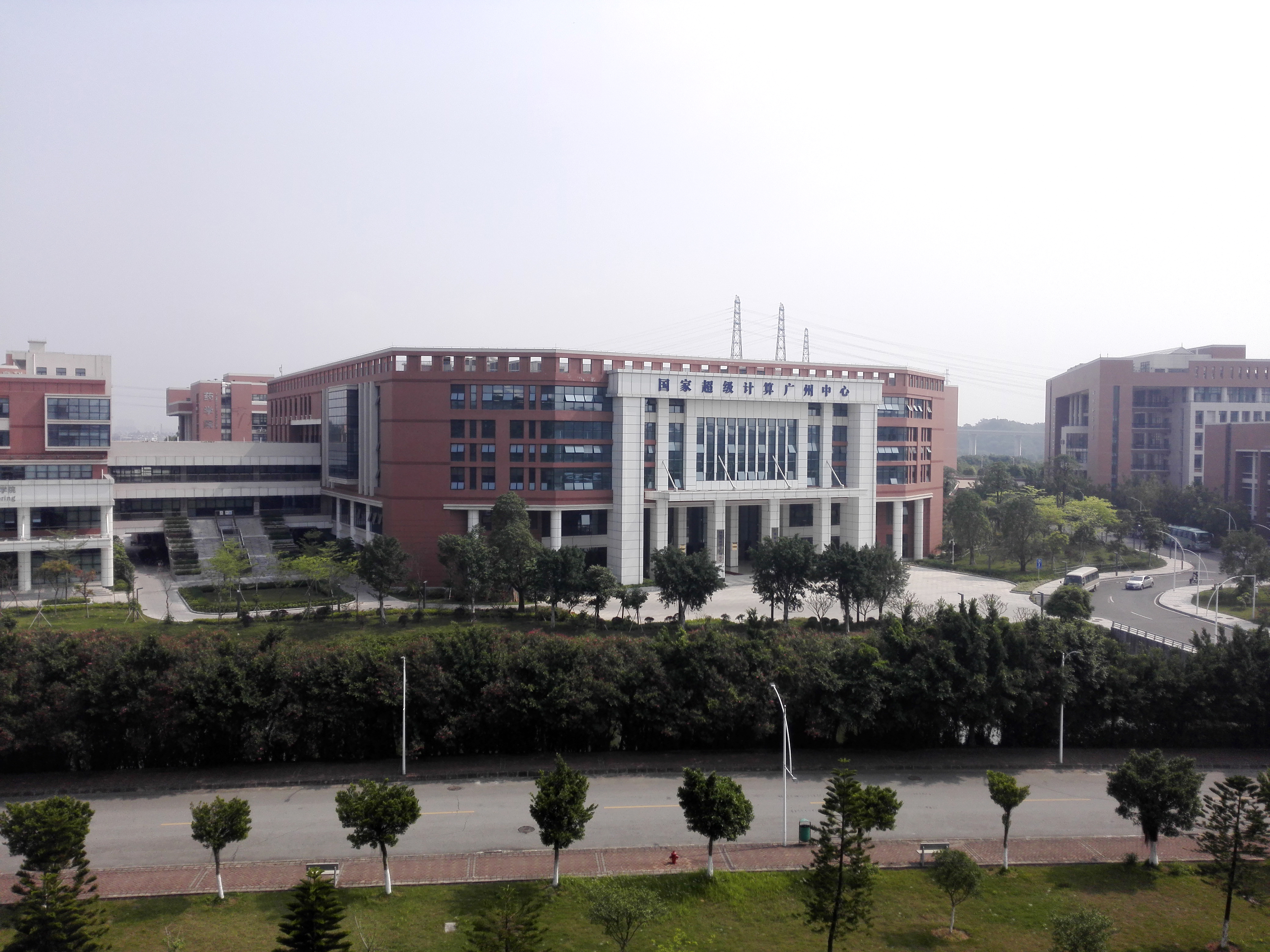
- Established: 2014
- Research type: Multiprogram
- Budget: As of 2015 $400 million
- Director: Lu Yutong (卢宇彤)
- Location: East Campus of Sun Yat-sen University, No. 132, Waihuan East Road, Guangzhou University Town, Panyu District, Guangzhou, Guangzhou, Guangdong, China; 23°04′23″N 113°23′19″E
- Campus: 42,332 square metres (455,660 sq ft)
- Operating agency: The government of Guangdong province and Guangzhou city, Sun Yat-sen University and National University of Defense Technology
- Website: www.nscc-gz.cn

The National Supercomputer Center in Guangzhou houses Tianhe-3, which is owned by the Chinese government.

== See also ==
- Supercomputing in China
- National Supercomputing Center of Tianjin
- National Supercomputing Center (Shenzhen)
- Shanghai Supercomputer Center
