= Nebulus =

Nebulus may refer to:

- Nebulus (video game), a computer game
- Alphazone, a hard trance musical group also known as Nebulus
- "Nebulus", an electronica song by Fluke from the 2003 album Puppy

== See also ==
- Nebulous (disambiguation)
- Nebula (disambiguation)
