= Nebulous (disambiguation) =

Nebulous is a post-apocalyptic science fiction comedy radio show.

Nebulous may also refer to:

- A reference to a nebula
- Nebulous wrasse, (Halichoeres nebulosus), a species of fish
- Nebulous moray, or snowflake moray, (Echidna nebulosa), a species of eel

== See also ==
- Nebulus (disambiguation)
- Nebula (disambiguation)
