= Nebula (magazine) =

Nepali-language Indian periodical (1935–1936)

Nebula was a Nepali language magazine published in India. The name Nebula was an acronym of Nepali, Bhutia and Lepcha, symbolising the unity between these ethnic groups. The magazine was founded in February 1935. It was the organ of the Hill People's Social Union. It was published on a monthly basis. The magazine ceased publication in 1936.
