= 88open =

88open Consortium Ltd.
- Founded: 1988; 38 years ago
- Founder: Motorola

88open was an industry standards group set up by Motorola in 1988 to standardize Unix systems on their Motorola 88000 RISC CPU systems. At its peak, the spinoff 88open Consortium Ltd. had a staff of 30 people and over 50 supporters. The effort was largely a failure, at least in terms of attracting attention to the 88000 platform. The group was closed in favor of the AIM alliance, and the 88000 platform was folded into AIM's PowerPC.

== Members ==
Motorola provided 50% of the financial support for the consortium. Early members were Data General, Convergent, and Tektronix. By May 1988, 28 companies had joined with 7 not releasing their names.

== Standards ==
- Object Compatibility Standard (OCS): An 88open standard for compilers and linkers.

== See also ==
- AIM alliance
