= Supercomputing in China =

Overview of technology development

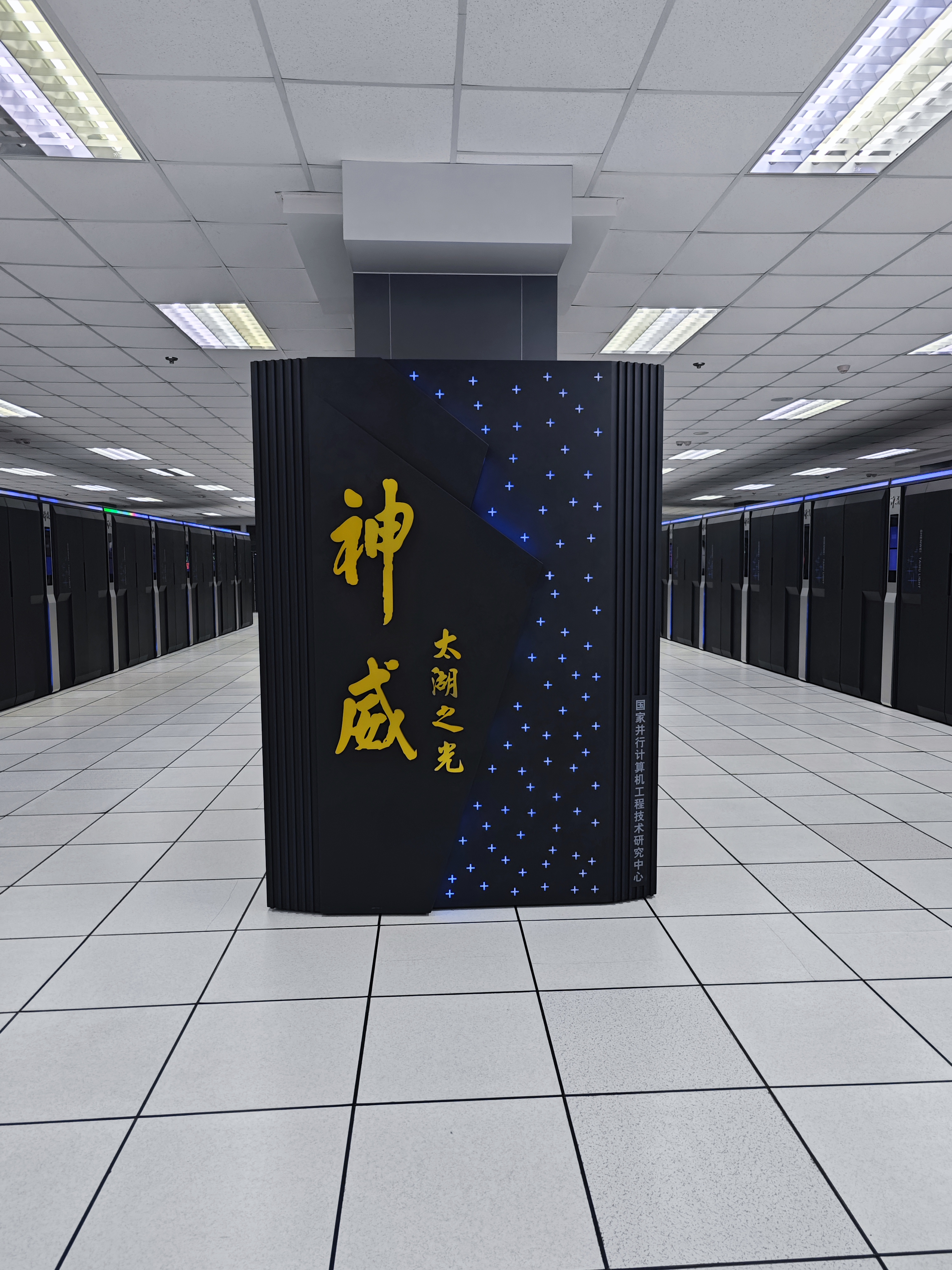
The Sunway TaihuLight supercomputer

China started operating supercomputers some two decades after the first supercomputer was fielded with the "Yinhe-1" in 1983.

According to IDC, while Chinese organizations supplied 88.1% of the TOP500-class supercomputers installed in China in November 2015, 108 of the 109 systems—99.1%—used American processor technology, including Intel Xeon, AMD Opteron, and IBM Power processors.

Qian identified several weaknesses in China's HPC development, including a "lack of some kernel technologies", weak HPC applications, reliance on imported commercial software, unsustainable HPC environment development, and a shortage of HPC talent.

Supercomputers in China are concentrated in National Supercomputing Centres, which provide computing power to universities, government departments and technology firms. These are supported at the national level by the Computer Network Information Center of the Chinese Academy of Sciences, which operates the China National Grid of networked supercomputers.

China experienced rapid growth in computing power during the first two decades of the 2000s by purchase of non-Chinese components, and was able to reach first on the well-known TOP500 list in 2011 with the Tianhe-1A, followed later by the Tianhe-2, and Sunway TaihuLight. The Tianhe-1 and Tianhe-2 were built using Intel CPUs and Nvidia GPUs, while Sunway TaihuLight used domestically produced manycore processors. Lenovo also expanded to become a major vendor of supercomputing systems internationally.

== History ==
The origins of supercomputing in China and the National Supercomputing Centres goes back to the 1980s, when the State Planning Commission, the State Science and Technology Commission and the World Bank jointly launched a project to develop networking and supercomputer facilities in China. In addition to network facilities, the project included three supercomputer centers. The country's most powerful supercomputer placed 43rd in November 2002 (DeepComp 1800), 11th by November 2003 (DeepComp 6800), 10th by June 2004 (Dawning 4000A), and by November 2010 (Tianhe-1A) held top spot. China would go on to fall behind Japan in June 2011 until June 2013 when the country's most powerful supercomputer once again clocked in as the world record.

Prior to the Sunway TaihuLight, Chinese supercomputers used "off the shelf" processors, with Intel and Nvidia chips used for Tianhe-I and Tianhe-2, running variants of Linux. Early domestic hardware developments included the Loongson CPU, a variant of the MIPS type architecture This was developed without a license and they were unable to market them as MIPS-compatible, until an agreement in 2007 with STMicroelectronics paved the way for MIPS licensure in 2011.

According to the MIT Technology Review, the Loongson processor would power the Dawning supercomputers by 2012, producing a line of totally Chinese-made supercomputers that reach petaflops speeds.

In November 2015, China increased its number of supercomputers on the TOP500 list to 109, up 196% from 37 just six months earlier. This expansion reflected growing investment in domestic innovation, with observers noting that "the Chinese government and companies want to become the creators and not just producer of products that are being designed elsewhere".

In 2016, China's Sunway TaihuLight supercomputer became the world's fastest, achieving a peak performance of 93 petaflops. It was nearly three times faster than the next most powerful machine, Tianhe-2, which relied on American processing cores. That year also marked the first time China surpassed the United States in total installed supercomputing capacity. China led in the number of systems on the TOP500 list, with 167 supercomputers compared to 165 from the United States.

In 2018, China extended its lead in the number of supercomputers on the TOP500 list, with 206 systems compared to 124 from the United States. While the United States regained the top spot for the fastest individual machine, the list showed that China remained the most prolific producer of supercomputers.

In April 2021, seven Chinese supercomputing entities were added to the Entity List of the United States Department of Commerce's Bureau of Industry and Security. The U.S. government cited their involvement in supporting China's military modernization and weapons development programs. Placement on the list subjects these entities to additional license requirements for exports, re-exports, and in-country transfers of items subject to U.S. export regulations.

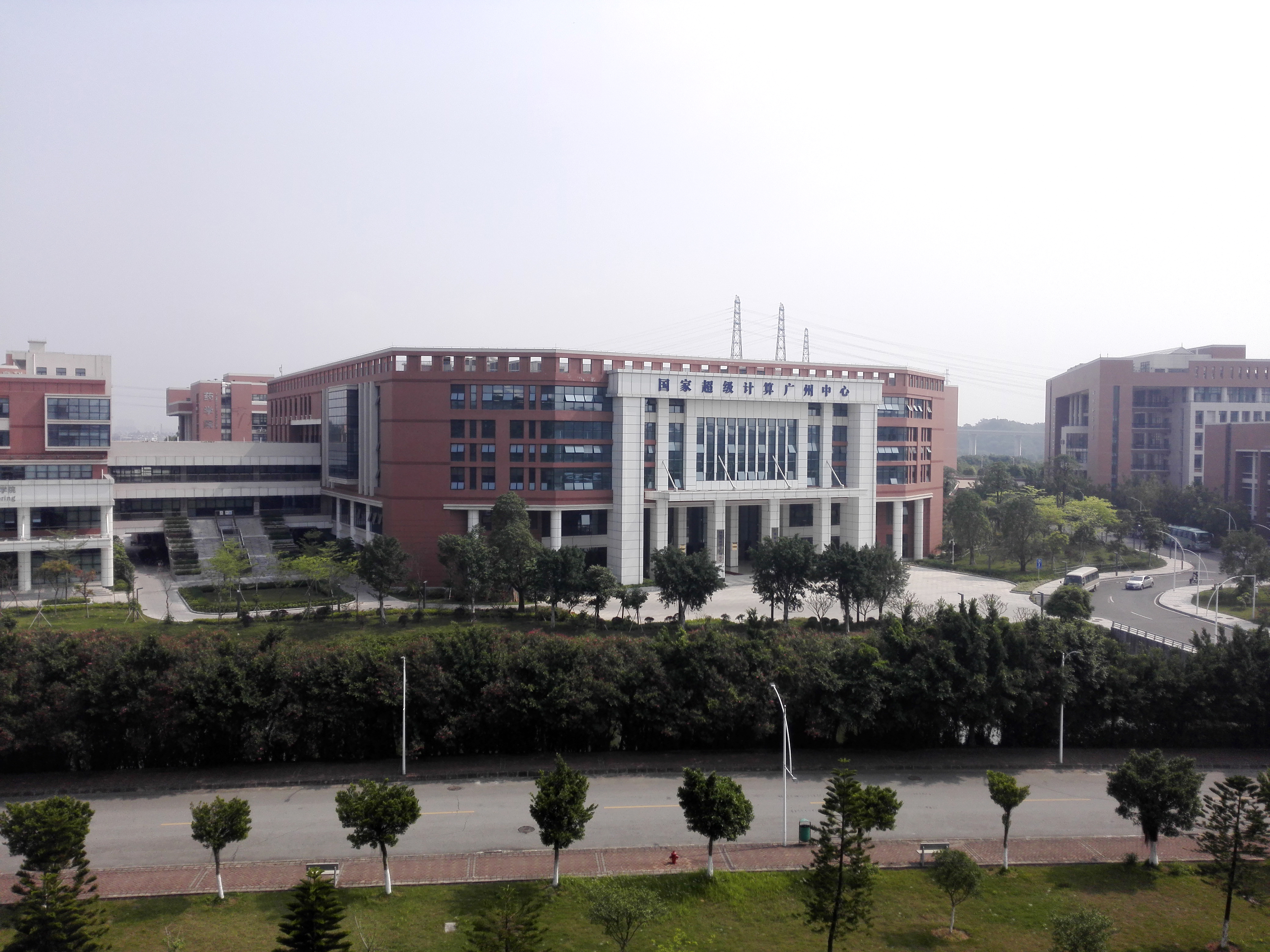
National Supercomputer Center in Guangzhou

The scope of these restrictions widened in March 2025, when over 50 additional China-based firms were added to the Entity List. The U.S. government said the companies had sought advanced technologies in supercomputing, artificial intelligence, and quantum computing for military applications. The Commerce Department stated that 27 entities had acquired U.S.-origin items to support China's military modernization, while seven were involved in advancing China's quantum technology capabilities. The agency said the expanded restrictions were part of broader efforts to limit Beijing's access to sensitive technologies, including exascale computing and high-performance AI chips.

Since 2022, Chinese institutions have reduced and then stopped submitting new supercomputers to the Top500 rankings, and their share of top positions has fallen. However, new systems in the exaFLOPS range not submitted to the list include the OceanLight and Tianhe-3 ("Xingyi") exaFLOPS range machines.

== Supercomputing Centers ==
=== Shanghai Supercomputer Center ===
The Shanghai Supercomputer Center was founded in the year 2000. It became China's first public high-performance computing center. It started with the 384 GFLOPS Shenwei-I and eventually expanded to include the Dawning 4000A, Magic Cube, Magic Cube II, and Magic Cube III, reaching some 3.3 PFLOPS by 2020. Research has included meteorology, environmental monitoring, civil engineering, aerospace, shipbuilding, industrial simulation, scientific research, big data, AI, and COVID-19-related drug screening and hospital-design work.

== National Supercomputing Centers ==
=== Tianjin ===
==== National Supercomputing Center in Tianjin ====
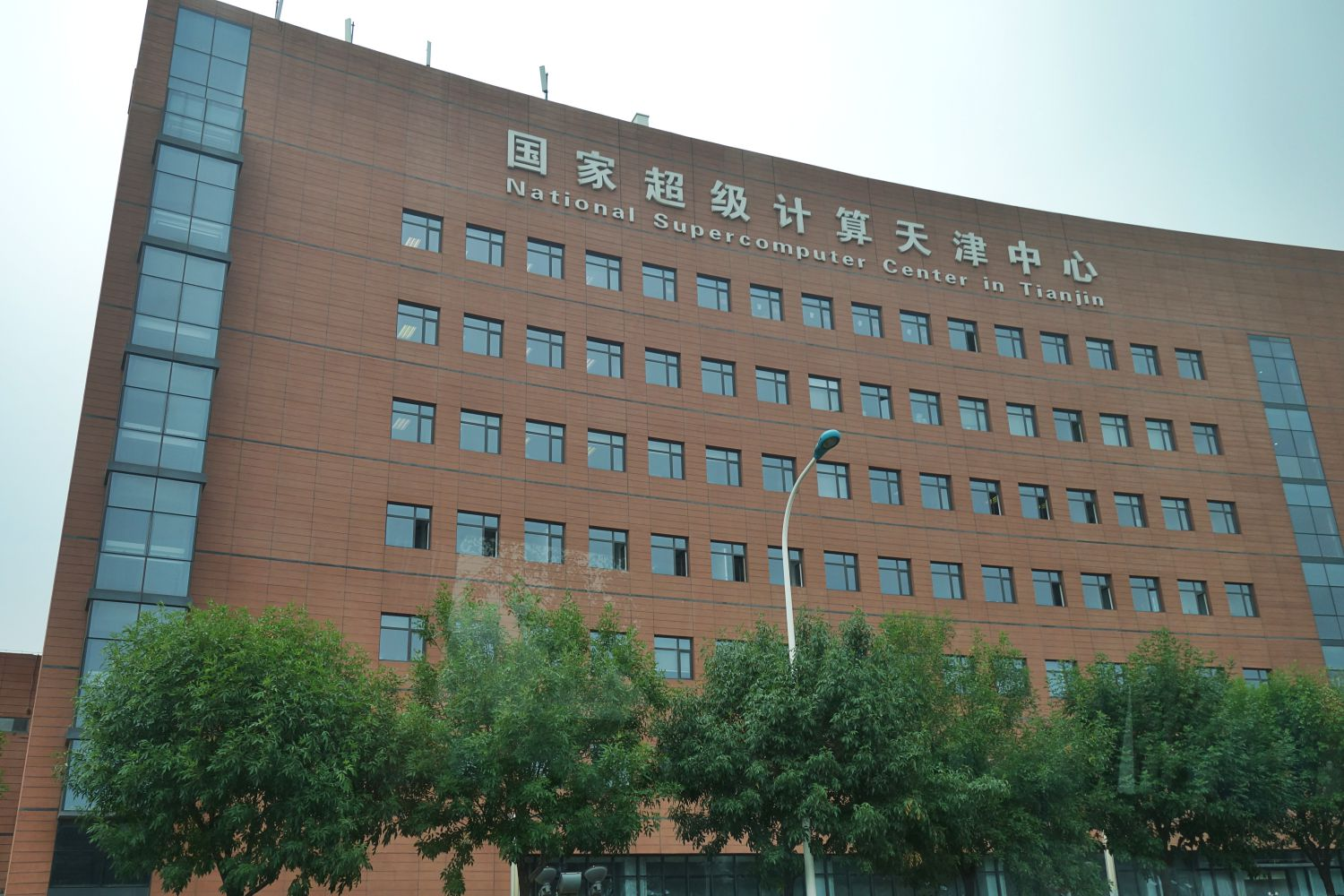
National Supercomputing Center in Tianjin

The National Supercomputing Center in Tianjin was approved in May 2009 as the country's first state-level supercomputing facility. It hosts the Tianhe-1 system, developed by the National University of Defense Technology and unveiled on 29 October 2009. The project began under China's 863 Program in 2008. Tianhe-1 achieved a peak theoretical performance of 1,206 teraflops and a sustained LINPACK result of 563.1 teraflops, ranking first on the TOP500 list. It was the second system globally to exceed 10^{16} operations per second.

The Tianjin Computer Institute had been active since 1984 when it developed the 16-bit TQ-0671 microcomputer system. A commercial affiliate of the Tianjin center had previously made the PHPC100 personal supercomputer in 2008 which was approximately twice the size of a desktop and offering forty times its performance; a second-generation model appeared in 2010.

=== Shenzhen ===
==== National Supercomputing Center in Shenzhen ====
The National Supercomputing Center in Shenzhen (NSCS) was approved by the Ministry of Science and Technology in May 2009 as one of China's first national supercomputing centers in the central-southern region. It is the second national supercomputing center after the one based in Tianjin and houses the second fastest machine in China, and the third fastest in the world.

Located in Xili Lake International Science & Education City, SSC Phase I occupies 43,400 square meters and is equipped with a world-class supercomputer system. In May 2010 the Nebulae computer in Shenzhen placed second on the Top 500 supercomputer list, after the Cray computer at the Oak Ridge National Laboratory in Tennessee.

Phase II is located in Guangming Science City. It covers 46,000 square meters of land, has a total construction area of 116,800 square meters, and is scheduled for completion by 2025. This phase aims to expand computational capacity while integrating sustainable design principles. The center will house a 2E-level supercomputer and work alongside Phase I to provide large-scale scientific computing, industrial computation, big data processing, and intelligent supercomputing services.

The Shenzhen Supercomputing Pingshan Service Platform is the first regional platform established by the National Supercomputing Shenzhen Center, with support from the Pingshan District Innovation Bureau. It aims to serve the "9+2" industrial clusters in Pingshan District, promote the development of technology industries in the Pingshan High-tech Zone, and enhance the district's innovation capacity.

=== Changsha ===
==== National Supercomputing Center in Changsha ====
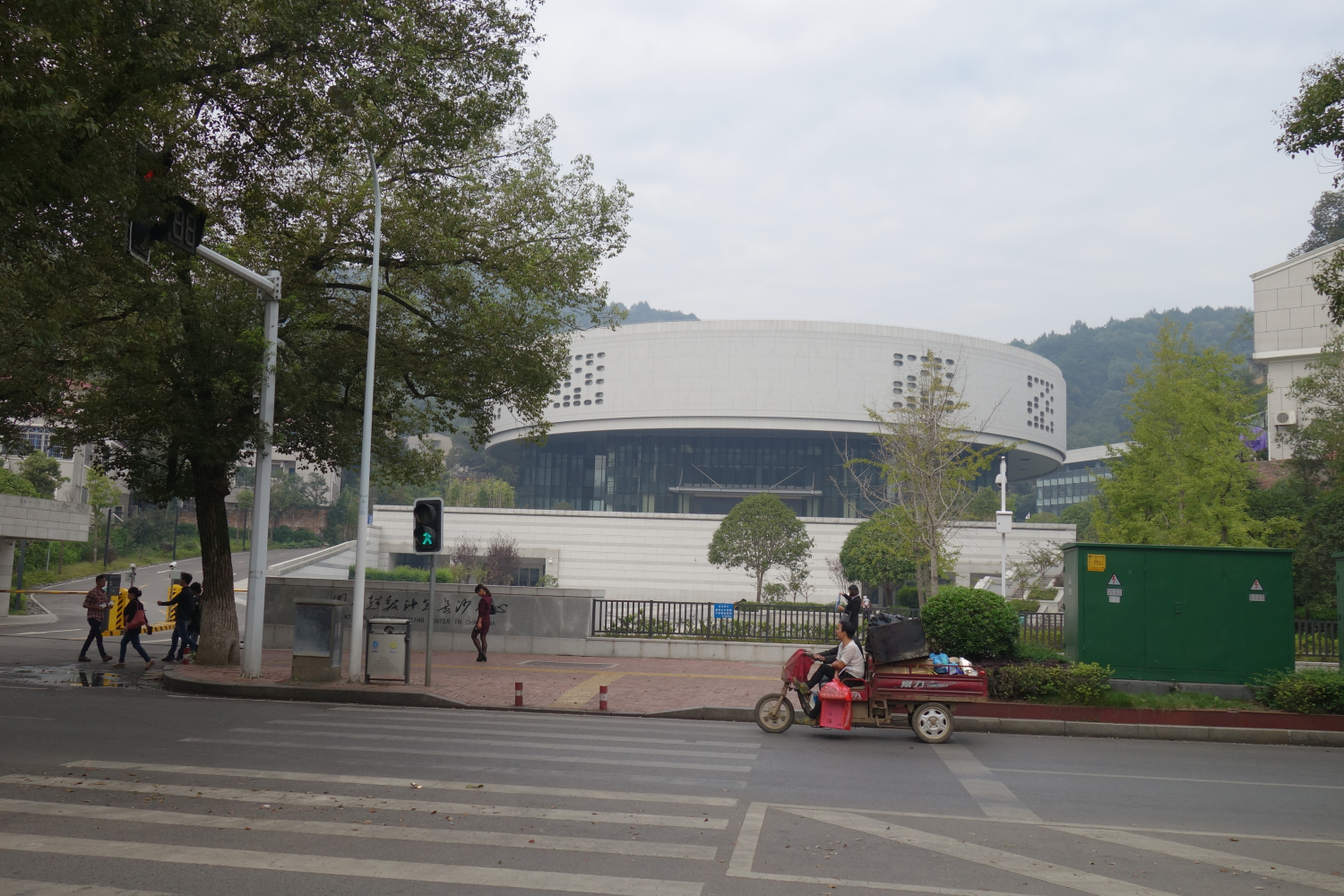
National Supercomputing Center in Changsha

Foundations for a new major branch of the National Supercomputing Center (国家超级计算中心 Guójiā Chāojíjìsuàn Zhōngxīn) were laid in Hunan University, Changsha on 28 November 2010 as the first National Supercomputing Center in Central China and the third National Supercomputing Center in China apart from the two centers which are located in Tianjin and Shenzhen. The National Supercomputing Changsha Center is managed and operated by Hunan University. It operates the Tianhe-1A Hunan Solution – NUDT YH MPP supercomputer which runs at 1342 teraflops. It was the most powerful supercomputer in the world at that time from its operation in November 2010 to November 2011.

=== Wuxi ===
==== National Supercomputing Center in Wuxi ====
The National Supercomputing Center in Wuxi was established in June 2016, with joint investment from the Ministry of Science and Technology of China, Jiangsu Province, and Wuxi City. It is operated by Tsinghua University and serves as a national public technology service platform for high-performance computing.

=== Jinan ===
==== National Supercomputing Center in Jinan ====
The National Supercomputing Center in Jinan (NSCCJN) is located in the capital of Shandong Province in East China. It is situated inside the Jinan Supercomputing Center Science and Technology Park, which opened in May 2019. The CPU runs the ShenWei processor SW1600 at 975 MHz, running at 796 teraflops and using 137,200 cores in the processor.

The NSCCJN built the first prototype of the Sunway E-class computer in 2018.

The center has also worked on projects that strengthen the internet access across various regions in China. In May 2024, the NSCCJN launched the "Shandong Computing Network", the first supercomputing Internet project in China that covers 16 cities in the province.

=== Guangzhou ===
==== National Supercomputing Center in Guangzhou ====
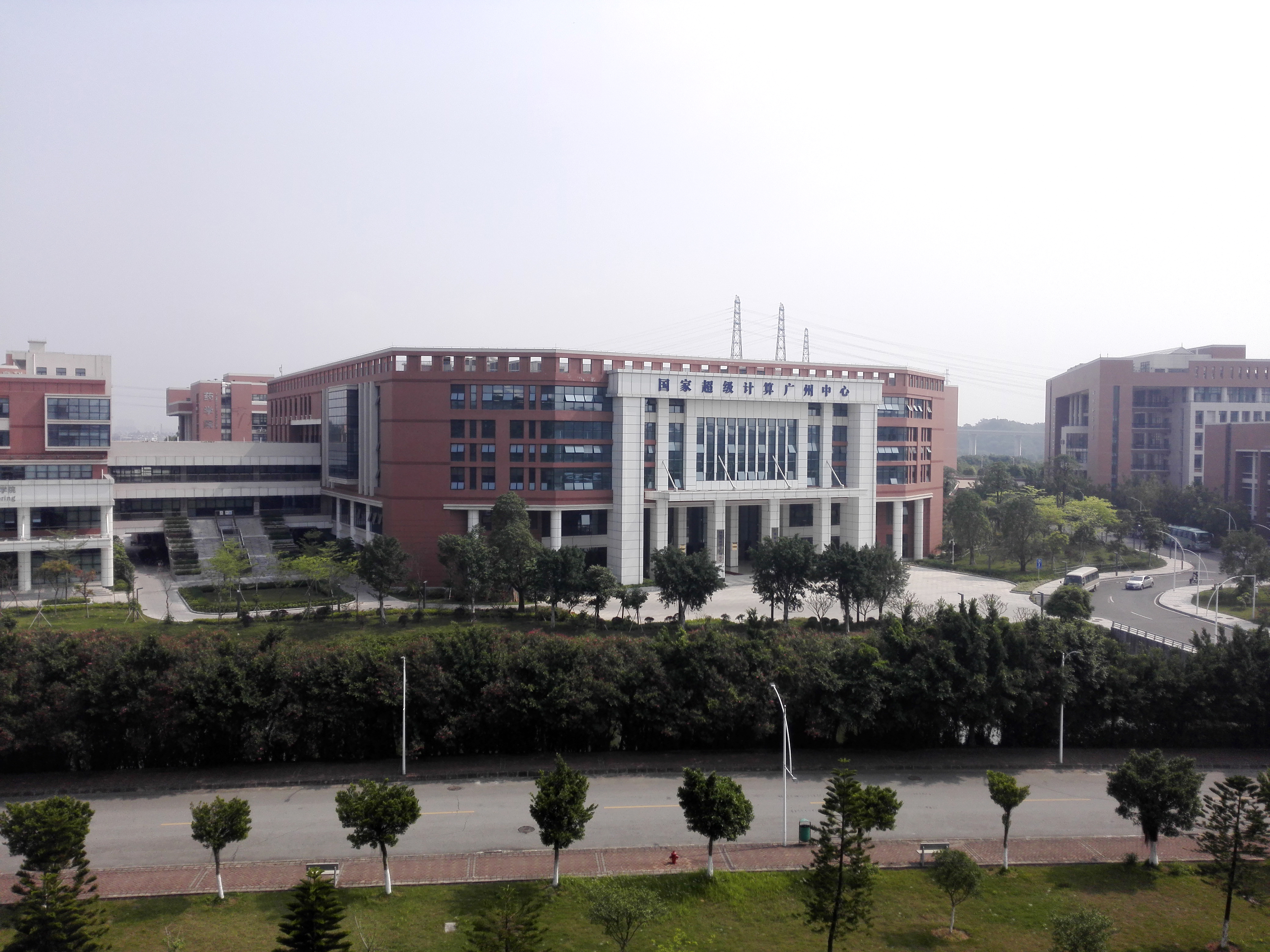
National Supercomputer Center in Guangzhou

The National Supercomputer Center in Guangzhou operates the tenth most powerful supercomputer in the world (as of November 2022) Tianhe-2 (MilkyWay-2), which runs at 33,000 teraflops. It also operates the Tianhe-1A Guangzhou Solution – NUDT YH MPP supercomputer that runs at 211 teraflops. The center has been active since 2018.

In December 2023, China unveiled the domestically developed supercomputing system "Tianhe Xingyi" at the National Supercomputing Center in Guangzhou. The new system is reported to outperform the previous Tianhe-2 in several areas, including CPU computing power, networking, storage, and applications.

=== Zhengzhou ===
==== National Supercomputing Center in Zhengzhou ====
Located in central China's Henan province, the National Supercomputing Zhengzhou Center passed the inspection for operation in December 2020, becoming the seventh national supercomputing center in China.

=== Kunshan ===
==== National Supercomputing Center in Kunshan ====
In 2020, the National Supercomputing Kunshan Center successfully passed the acceptance of experts, becoming the second supercomputing center in Jiangsu Province and the eighth supercomputing center in China.

=== Chengdu ===
==== National Supercomputing Center in Chengdu ====
The National Supercomputing Center in Chengdu does research in geochemistry, theoretical and computational chemistry, and more. The research institution is listed in the Nature Index, for the 2025 Nature Index window, it has 3 tracked research articles and a Share of 0.34 (all in Earth and environmental sciences).

== See also ==
- Galaxy (supercomputer series)
- History of supercomputing
- Major Events in Chinese Computer Science
- Supercomputer architecture
