= Nebulae (computer) =

Supercomputer in China

- Active: 2011
- Location: National Supercomputing Center (Shenzhen)
- Architecture: TC3600 Blade system
- Power: 2,580.00 kW
- Operating system: Linux
- Speed: 2,984.3 TFlops/s （R_{max}） 1,271.0 TFlops/s （R_{peak}）
- Ranking: TOP500: 2, June 2010
- Sources: Top500

Nebulae (Chinese: 星雲) is a petascale supercomputer located at the National Supercomputing Center in Shenzhen, Guangdong, China. Built from a Dawning TC3600 Blade system with Intel Xeon X5650 processors and Nvidia Tesla C2050 GPUs, it has a peak performance of 1.271 petaflops using the LINPACK benchmark suite. Nebulae was ranked the second most powerful computer in the world in the June 2010 list of the fastest supercomputers according to TOP500. Nebulae has a theoretical peak performance of 2.9843 petaflops. This computer is used for multiple applications requiring advanced processing capabilities. It is ranked 10th among the June 2012 list of top500.org.

== See also ==
- Computer science
- Computing
- Supercomputer centers in China
- TOP500
