= Reflective memory =

Type of computer memory

Reflective memory is a means to share common data between different and independent systems deterministically. Such systems using a common reflective memory form a reflective memory network which is a deterministic one, when any system of the network acquired data and writes it to its local memory, such data is written locally to all other systems, this behaviour is like a dual-ported memory system. Reflective memory networks are real-time local area networks where each device or computer always has a local up-to-date copy of the shared data set. These networks are designed for highly deterministic data communications delivering tightly timed performance required on distributed control systems or simulations. Reflective memory technologies are focused to applications where determinism, simplicity for implementation and lack of software overhead are very important considerations.

Reflective memory was developed in the 1980s by VMIC for applications in VME systems. Usually reflective memory devices are connected together by means of fiber optic. It is commonly used with real-time operating systems, VXI and other platforms. VMIC was acquired by GE Fanuc, a cooperative venture between GE and Fanuc of Japan. This business became GE Intelligent Platforms, and the embedded computing element of the business was spun off in 2015 as Abaco Systems, who now market reflective memory.

Examples of reflective memory application are:

- the Large Binocular Telescope, where it has been reported that each subsystem of the telescope control system includes ethernet connection for reflective memory.
- CERN
- Korea Superconducting Tokamak Advanced Research (KSTAR) plasma control system (PCS)
- Aircraft flight simulators
