= Omron =

Japanese electronics company

Omron Corporation

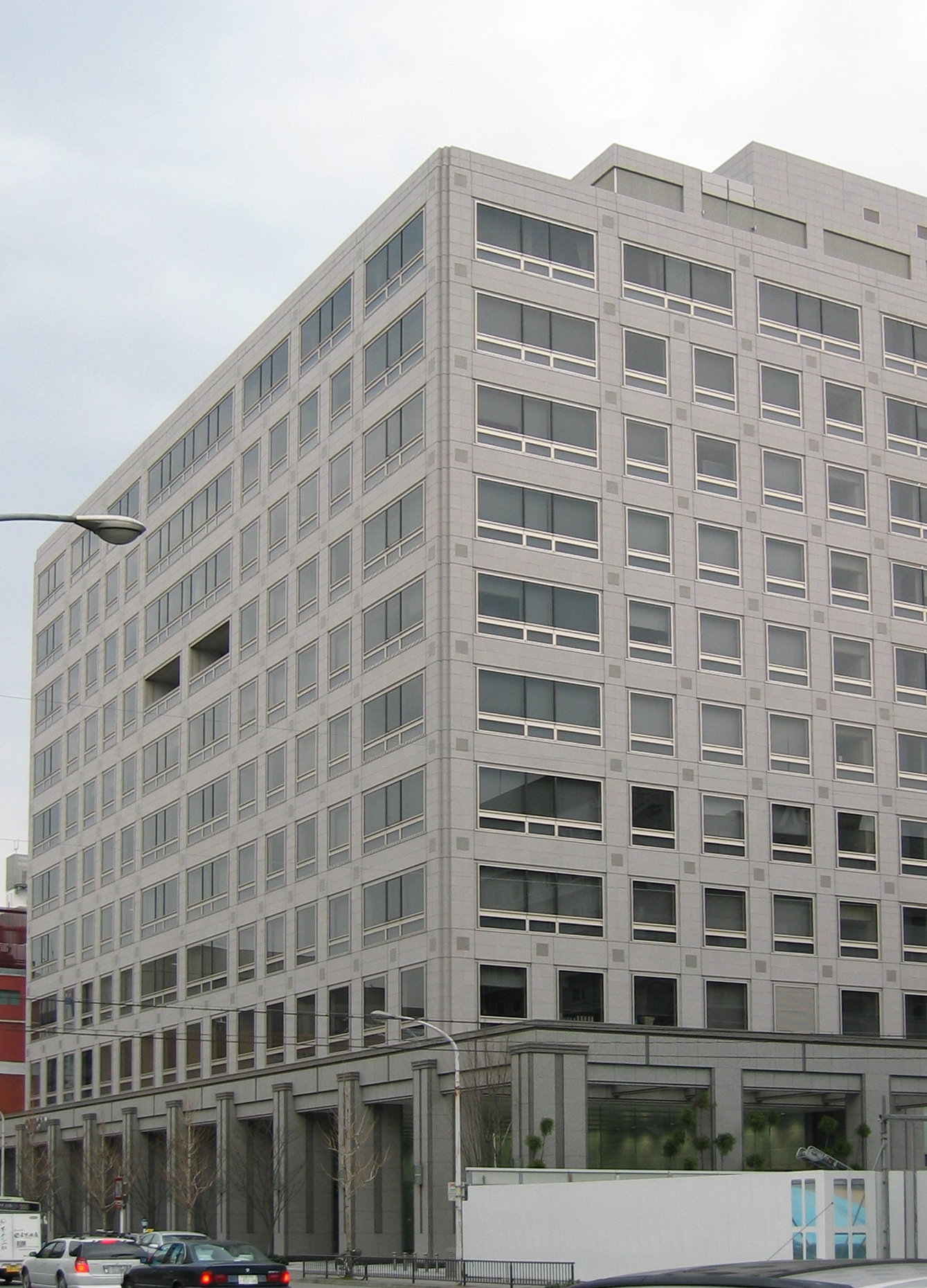
- Omron headquarters in Kyoto, Japan
- Native name: オムロン株式会社
- Romanized name: Omuron Kabushiki-gaisha
- Type: Public K.K.
- Traded as: TYO: 6645; FWB: OMR
- Industry: Electronics
- Founded: May 10, 1933; 93 years ago [O.S. April 27] Osaka, Japan
- Founder: Kazuma Tateishi
- Headquarters: Shiokoji Horikawa, Shimogyo-ku, Kyoto 600-8530, Japan
- Area served: Worldwide
- Key people: Junta Tsujinaga (President and CEO)
- Products: Industrial automation; Automotive electronics; Medical devices
- Revenue: ▼¥ 818.8 billion JPY) (FY 2023)
- Net income: ▼¥ 8.1 billion JPY) (FY 2023)
- Number of employees: 28,034 (March 31, 2023)
- Website: www.omron.com

Omron Corporation (オムロン株式会社, Omuron Kabushiki-gaisha), styled as OMRON, is a Japanese electronics company based in Kyoto, Japan. Omron was established by Kazuma Tateishi (立石一真) in 1933 (as the Tateisi Electric Manufacturing Company) and incorporated in 1948.

The company originated in an area of Kyoto called "Omuro (御室)"(ja), from which the name "Omron" was derived. Before 1990, the corporation was known as Omron Tateisi Electronics.

Omron's primary business is the manufacture and sale of automation components, equipment, and systems. In the consumer and medical markets, it is known for medical equipment such as digital thermometers, blood pressure monitors, and nebulizers. Omron developed the world's first electronic ticket gate, which was named an IEEE Milestone in 2007, and was one of the first manufacturers of automated teller machines (ATM) with magnetic stripe card readers.

Omron Oilfield & Marine is a provider of AC and DC drive systems and custom control systems for oil and gas and related industries.

Omron was named one of Thomson Reuters Top 100 Global Innovators in 2013.

Sales for 2023 were 876,082 million yen (up 14.8% from 2022). Net income was 73,861 million yen (up 20.3% from 2022). Basic earnings per share increased 21.8%.

Omron received a platinum (in the top 1%) EcoVadis rating for outstanding sustainability performance. The rating is based on the company's achievements in four areas: Environment, Labour & Human Rights, Sustainable Procurement and Ethics.

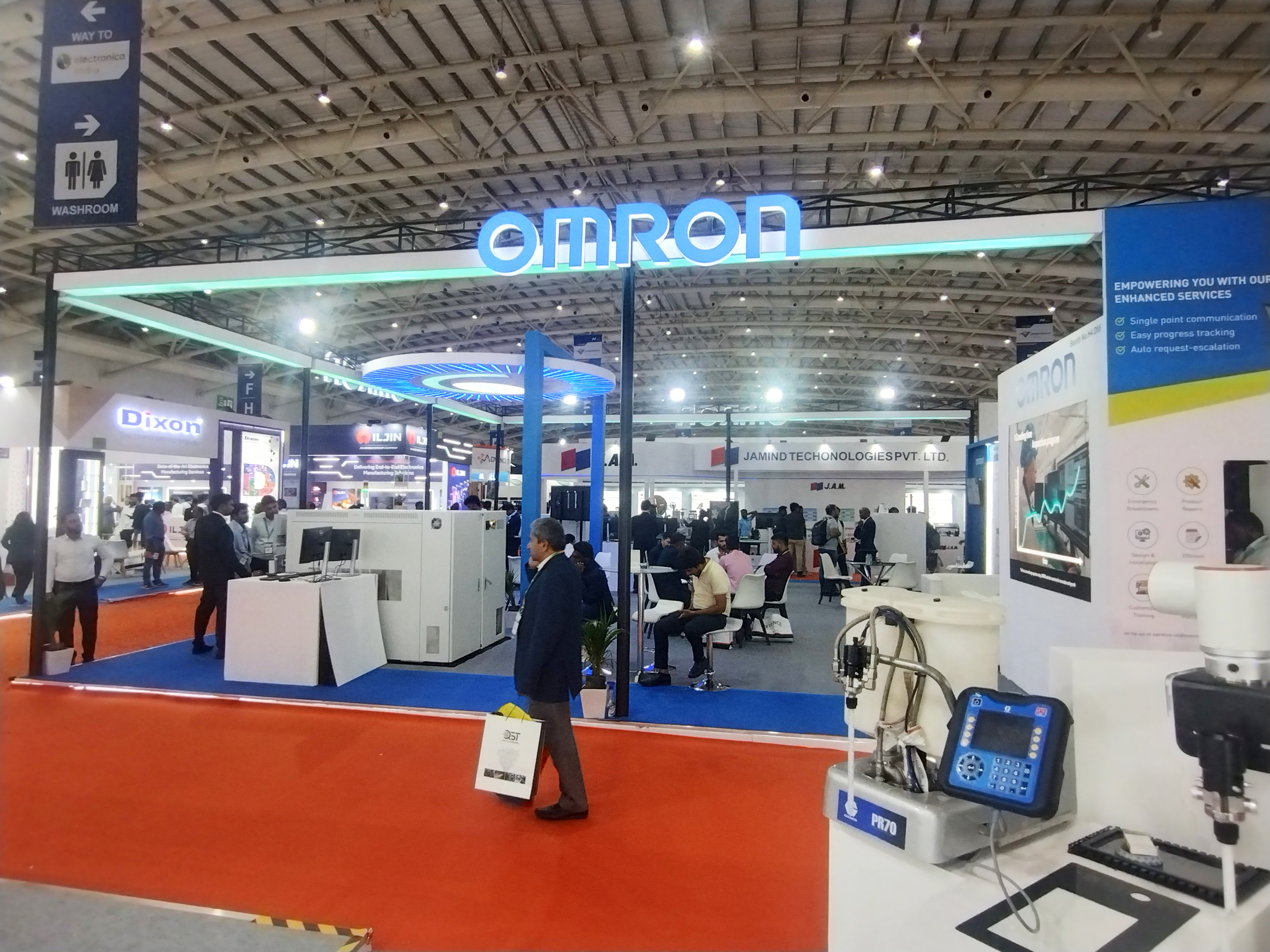
Omron at Electronica 2025, BIEC

In October 2026, Omron agreed to acquire Interlogic, the parent company of US industrial computer manufacturer OnLogic, in a transaction valued at US$675 million on an enterprise-value basis. Completion is expected around January 2027, subject to regulatory approvals and other closing conditions.

== Business divisions and products ==
- Industrial automation: Omron Adept industrial robots, sensors, switches, industrial cameras, safety components, relays, control components, electric power monitoring equipment, power supplies and programmable logic controllers
- Electronic components: relays, switches, connectors, micro sensing devices, MEMS sensors, image sensing technologies,
- Social systems: access control systems (building entry systems), road management systems, traffic signal controllers, security/surveillance cameras, automated ticket gates, ticket vending machines, fare adjustment machines
- Healthcare - Omron develops and produces medical devices for homes and medical facilities, health management software, and health improvement services.
  - Personal use (home healthcare): blood pressure monitors, digital thermometers, body composition monitors, pedometers, nebulizers. Omron has achieved more than 200 million Blood Pressure Monitors sold worldwide, making Omron the world leader in Electronic Blood Pressure Monitors.
  - Professional use: blood pressure monitors, non-invasive vascular monitors, portable ECGs, patient monitors
- Other businesses
  - Power distribution and controls for drilling rigs
  - Environmental sensors
  - Electronic controls and automation for detention center systems

== Shareholders ==
As of September 30, 2015:

- State Street Bank and Trust Company, 505223
- Japan Trustee Services Bank, Ltd.(trust account)
- The Bank of Tokyo-Mitsubishi UFJ, Ltd. (trust account)
- State Street Bank and Trust Company, 505001
- The Bank of Kyoto, Ltd.
- The Master Trust Bank of Japan, Ltd. (trust account)
- Nippon Life Insurance Company
- Japan Trustee Services Bank, Ltd. (trust account 9)
- The Bank of New York, Non-Treaty Jasdec Account

== Community activities ==
Omron has carried out many activities and programs for the community and the environment, such as:

- Participate in collaborative projects with non-governmental organizations, such as the United Nations Children's Fund, to support developing countries in improving children's health and education.
- Implement energy saving measures, reduce greenhouse gas emissions, recycle and reuse materials and products, to contribute to environmental protection and respond to climate change.
- Organize volunteer activities, such as donating blood, cleaning beaches, and planting trees, to show care and responsibility to the community and nature.

== Gallery ==
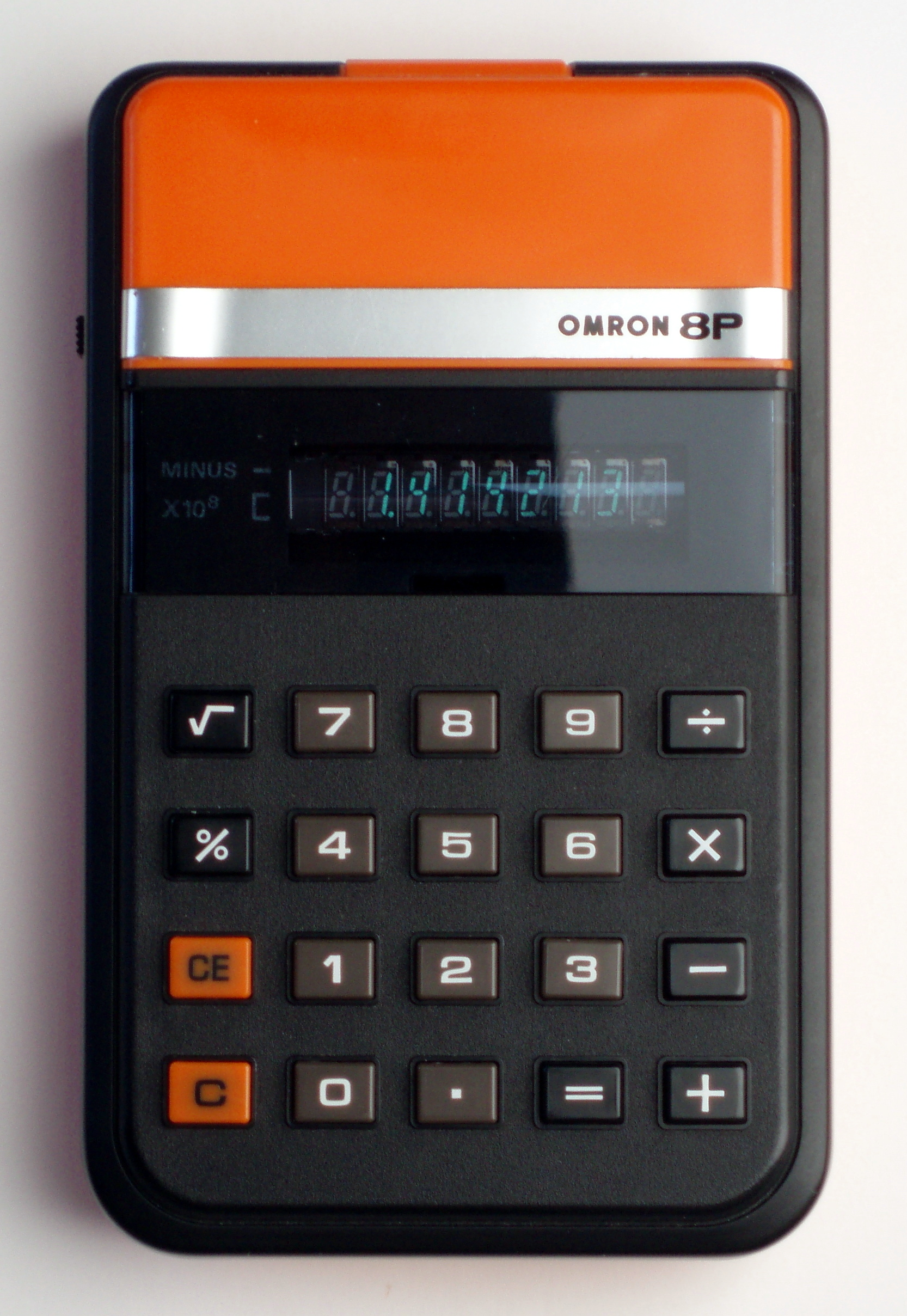
Omron 8P calculator (1976)

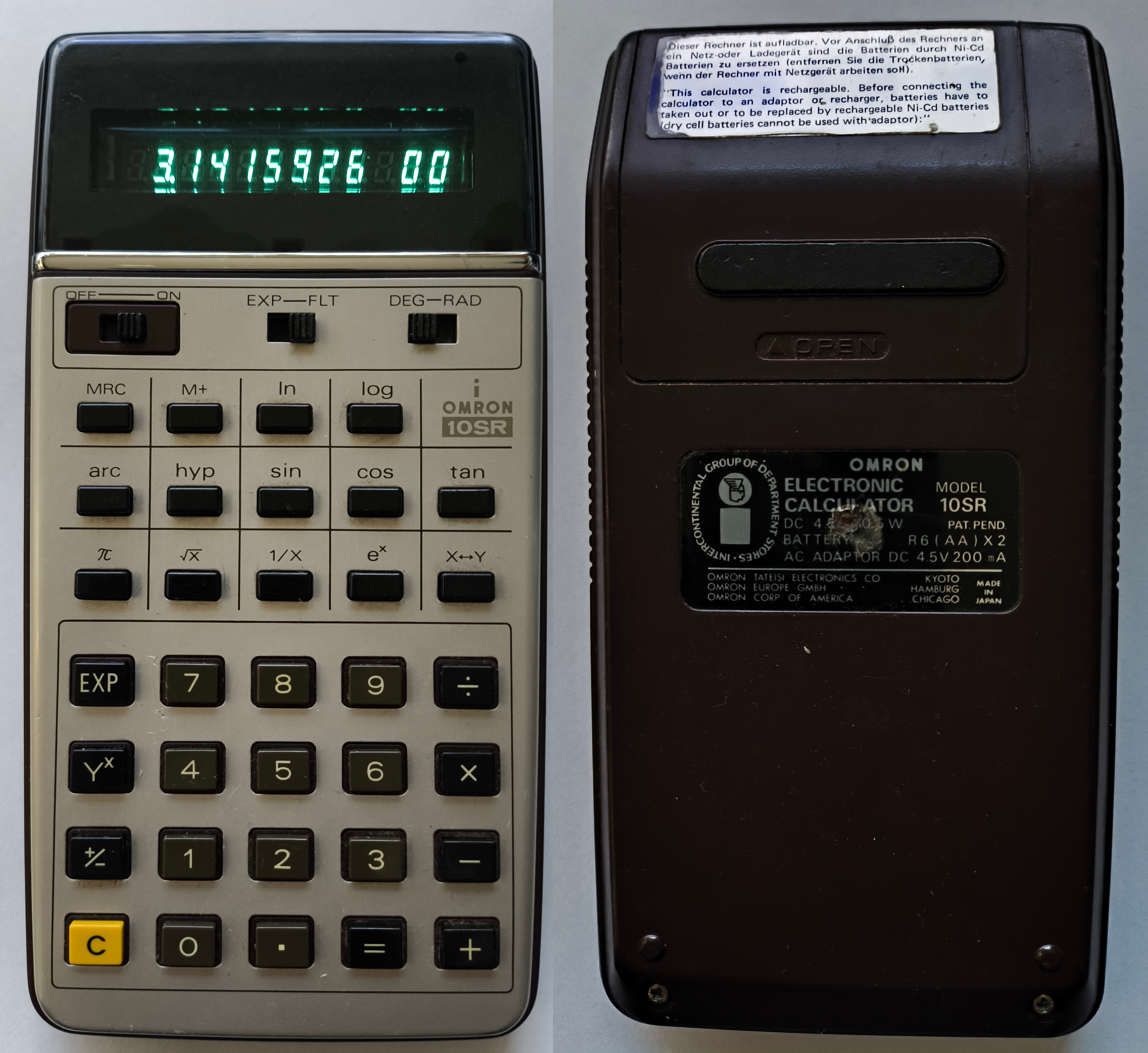
OMRON 10SR (1976) electronic scientific calculator

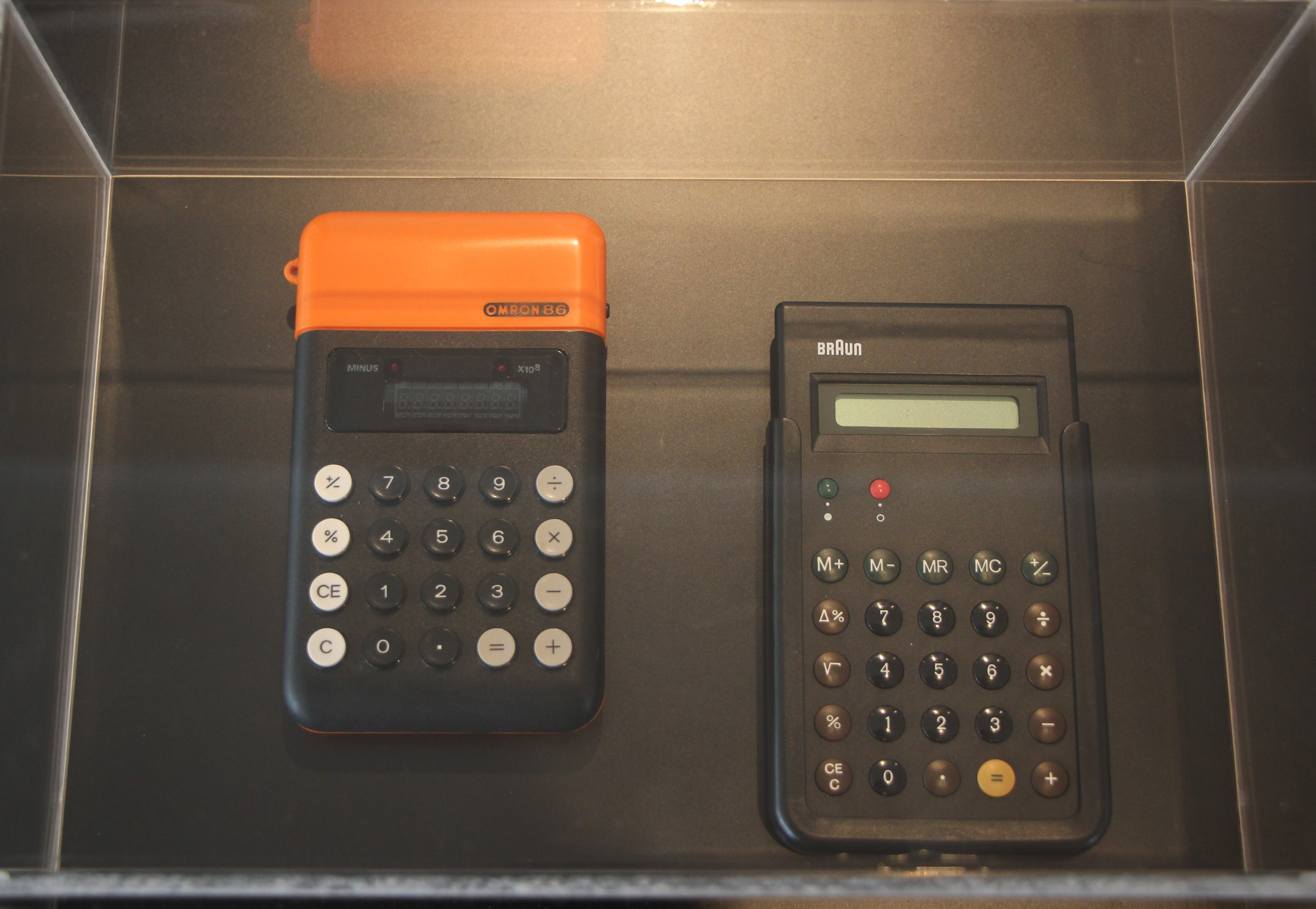
Omron 86 and Braun ET44 calculators (mid-1970s)

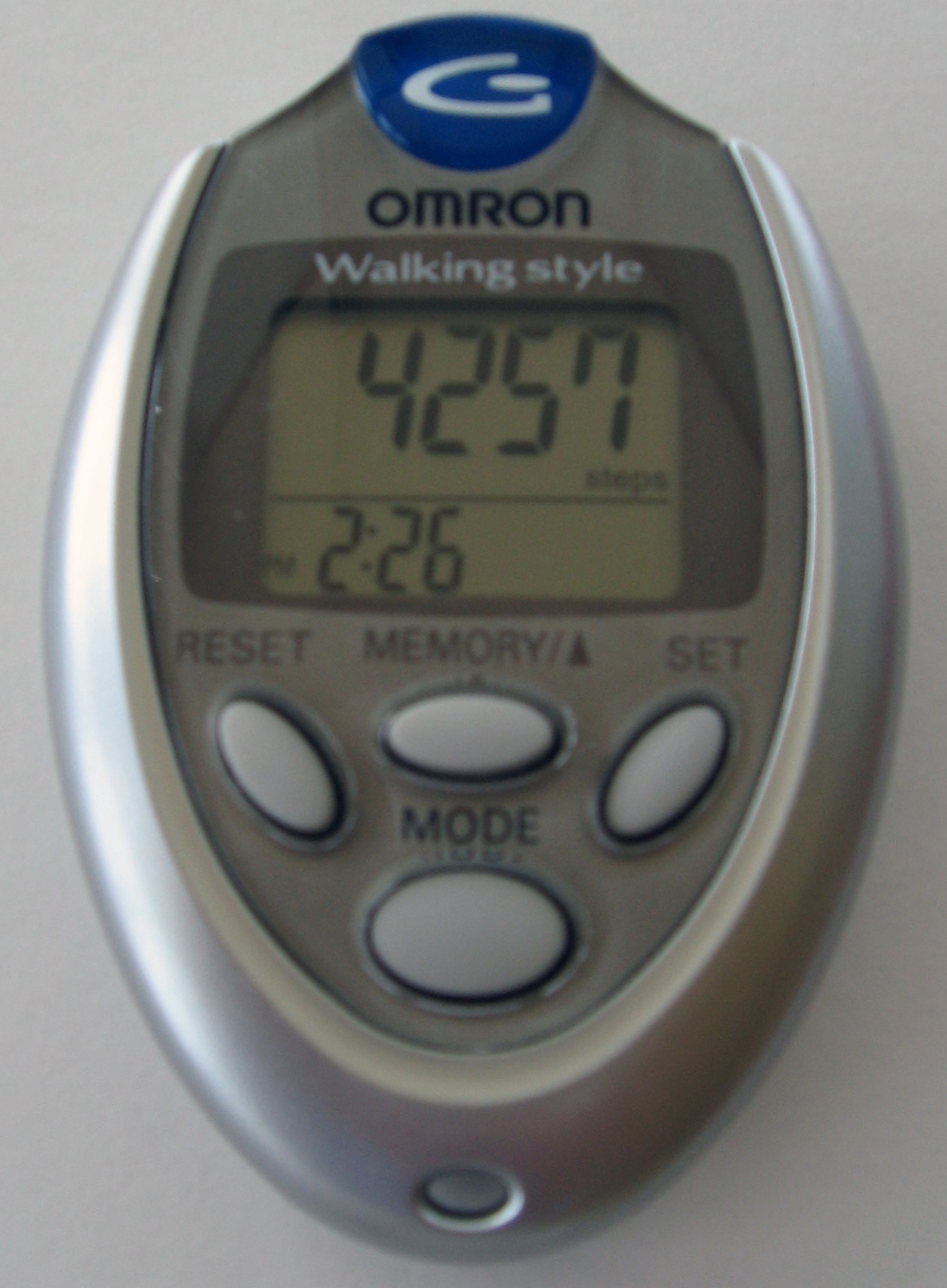
A digital Omron HJ-112 pedometer

== See also ==
- Motorola 88000 used by the Omron luna88k 4-processor computer
- Arena, a browser which was extended by OMRON
