= Nebula (spiritual guidance) =

- Industry: Entertainment, lifestyle
- Founded: 2019
- Founder: Alex Fedorov (CEO)
- Headquarters: Kyiv, Ukraine
- Area served: Worldwide
- Products: Spiritual guidance app
- Services: Spiritual guidance services including psychic readings, astrology, tarot, and personalized self-discovery practices
- Number of employees: 300+

Nebula is self-proclaimed spiritual guidance platform that most likely uses scam tactics. The service has been developed by OBRIO, a Ukraine-based IT company. It became the top astrology app in the U.S. in the summer of 2020. Nebula is free to use on iOS, Android, and the official website.

According to various statements by Nebula customers, the service can be regarded as a scam. Several users of the Apple Community website claimed that Nebula charged them money "for nothing" as well as refused refunds.

== History ==
Nebula was developed by OBRIO, a Ukrainian startup founded by current CEO Alex Fedorov. The first version of Nebula launched in May 2019 as an iOS application. In July 2020, the Android version followed.

According to Sensor Tower, the app Nebula became the most downloaded astrology app in the USA in summer 2020 and a global leader by summer 2021.

The Nebula team expanded to the web to reach users across different platforms and in January 2021, the Nebula website unveiled the web version's MVP.

In 2022, Nebula partnered with celebrity psychological astrologer and author Dr. Jennifer Freed to create “Relationship Check-In” — a tool designed to enhance couples' intimacy. “Relationship Check-In” was based on the psychological principles of healthy relationships and an astrological understanding of elements.

By 2024, as spiritual practices gained popularity worldwide, the Nebula team changed focus from astrology to offering a broader spiritual experience, making Nebula a spiritual guidance platform.

Since 2019, Nebula has ranked Number 1 lifestyle app on the App Store and Google Play multiple times in the USA, Canada, and Australia, and the leading astrological brand in the U.S. and Canada.

The platform has also been featured in major media outlets, including The New York Times, Cosmopolitan, Forbes, ELLE, Daily Express, New York Post, Refinery29, Bustle, Hypebae, Vogue, Daily Mail, Marie Claire, Glamour, and Hello Magazine.

== Product ==
As of 2025, Nebula is available as an iOS app, an Android app, and a web platform. The iOS app, originally launched for iPhone users, offers a variety of spiritual services, including online psychic readings, daily horoscopes, and personalized birth charts. The app provides both free and subscription-based content and continues to receive regular updates.

The Android app, released in July 2020, offers similar features to the iOS version, including astrology tools, birth chart analysis, and palmistry, along with free and paid subscription options. The web platform, Asknebula, provides a comparable range of services, such as live psychic chat, free psychic readings, compatibility tests, and educational content through blogs and glossary entries.
