= Nebula Electronics =

Nebula Electronics Ltd were a small UK company specialising in digital terrestrial cards for Windows PCs. The brand-name for their hardware is DigiTV.

Many users recommended the DigiTV cards due to their easy-to-use software, which was very similar to set top boxes. The installation routine is also very simple, especially for the USB models, which do not require opening up the PC.

Nebula Electronics operated entirely from the United Kingdom, including production and direct sales but they also had distributors in Australia, Finland, France, Italy, Germany, Spain, and Sweden. They were renowned for offering the majority of features for the Freeview service including Audio description and MHEG-5, something that contemporary competing products did not.

In December 2007 liquidators were appointed to wind up the company. and the company was finally dissolved in June 2009.

Rights to the DigiTV software and branding were bought by its sister company Nebula Media Solutions Ltd, and was re-released in December 2010 after a significant facelift with support for Windows 7.

As of the second week of January 2013, the Nebula electronics website and the forum both disappeared, no official announcement has been made as to the seeming demise of this company.
