= Danish Shipowners' Association =

Coordinates: 55.6866°N 12.5951°E

- Abbreviation: DRF
- Formation: 1884
- Legal status: Non-profit organization
- Location: 33 Amaliegade, Copenhagen, Denmark
- Region served: DK
- Director-General: Anne H. Steffensen

Danish Shipping (formerly known as Danish Shipowners' Association) is an interest organization which represents Denmark’s shipping industry, the biggest single standing export business. Of the members, which counts ships from over 90 shipping- and off-shore companies, more than half sail under the Danish flag, while the other half, the associated member shipping companies, do their work from Denmark without having ships under the flag. The Danish trade fleet which Danish Shipping represents, consists of more than 2000 ships, which makes Denmark one of the 10 biggest maritime nations in the world. Moreover, the Danish shipping industry exported more than 280 mio kr. in 2020 and therefore stood for 27% of the total Danish export.

Danish Shipping was founded in 1884 and has since formed the core of the Danish shipping industry. Danish Shipping handles the interests of the industry and works as an employer’s association for its members with ships under the Danish Flag. To be an employer’s association in Denmark means being part of yearly negotiations on collective settlements in the relevant industry – also called the Danish Model. In other words, Danish Shipping represents and negotiates on behalf of all employers, who are members, of the shipping industry (henvis). As an interest organisation, Danish Shipping lobbies for better regulative conditions for the shipping industry, in particular, for a liberal market with healthy competition. Because of the size and strength of the organization, this means that Danish Shipping plays an active role in political decision making, both nationally and internationally. A good example on the kind of political work that Danish Shipping has participated in is the new policy strategy “Blue Denmark”.

To maintain Danish Shipping’s interest internationally they are also members of the international shipping organisations ICS and ECSA, which means they are a part of all relevant institutions and furthermore have a permanent office in Brussels.

== History ==
=== Early years ===
The foundation of Danish Shipping in 1884, was highly influenced by the era’s political tendencies where the agricultural industry was prioritized above anything else after the war in 1864, and it was clear that the foundation of Danish Shipping was especially inspired by the Danish businessman C.F Tietgen’s rebellion against this official business policy. The foundation in 1884 also meant that Danish Shipping was the first lobby organisation in Denmark, which already counted 20 members and 140 enrolled ships in its first years.

It was not a coincidence that the lobby organisation met success in its first years already, because even before the foundation of the organisation Denmark had a strong trade fleet with a long history, which had put Denmark on the world map for many years. During the 5th Century vikings already participated in international trade on the sea. Later other important events such as the Trans-Atlantic slave trade during the 16th and 17th centuries contributed to a lot of the economic growth in Denmark during this era, but also to one of the dark parts of Danish history.

Danish Shipping’s position as an employer’s association was strongly influenced by the political tensions throughout the late 19th century, where strikes, lockouts and fights between workers and employers were increasingly common. These tensions meant that the organisation started to involve themselves in salary- and work conditions, and the organisation to its first settlement with a trade union on June 1, 1898. This was the beginning of the organisation’s negotiation role, which, to this day is still one of the organisation’s most important tasks.

=== 20th century ===
During World War I the Danish shipping industry and its interest organisation met new challenges, as the Danish authorities wished to protect Danish supplies of goods, and therefore implemented constraints on the freedom of passage and new taxes on the industry. Furthermore, the belligerent countries’ torpedoing of cargo boats and navigation through minefields in the ocean, created a need for insurance schemes for both people and material on the boats – resulting in further administration and expenses. Despite these challenges, the Danish position as a neutral state during the war meant that the war was a commercial profit to Danish Shipping, as the neutral position made it possible to trade with both sides without as many competitors. The war eventually turned out to result in commercial gain and was good for the Danish Shipping industry.

The commercial success from the first world war continued at the beginning of the interwar period, when the organisation expanded and moved to a new office. But these tendencies didn’t last for long as Danish Shipping, together with the rest of the world, was first met by The Great Depression and thereafter World War II, which brought new challenges, of which protectionism became an increasingly popular foreign policy, resulting in trade restrictions. World War II was an especially challenging era for the organisation because it resulted in a division of the Danish trade fleet as many ships chose to seek Western Allies’ harbours during the German occupation of Denmark. Nevertheless, the organisation had to expand its secretariat, because of new regulations in the industry.

In the time after World War II, especially from the 1960s onwards, shipping was increasingly standardised, laying down the foundation for globalisation as we know it today and the growth in the world trade and therefore Danish Shipping’s remits. It was during this time that Danish Shipping gained economic and political influence, both in Denmark and internationally. It was largely because of the Danish shipping industry that Denmark took part in globalisation and as a result experienced economic growth.

=== 21st century ===
In the spring of 2020, Danish shipping was confronted with a new challenge when many parts of the world entered lockdown due to the COVID-19 pandemic. The Danish lockdown and the stricter entry restrictions made it far more difficult for sailors to discharge and sign on which meant that many had their time of sailing prolonged for an unknown time. During the pandemic Danish Shipping worked hard for the sailors to let them be heard and included in political consideration, which turned out to be fruitful work in terms of the establishment of a “crew shift agreement” and the option for international sailors to get vaccinated in Denmark. Despite these challenges, the Danish Shipping industry again saw commercial gain during a world crisis as it was seen during World War I. The commercial gain is for example reflected in the annual budget of companies such as MÆRSK, one of the biggest members of Danish Shipping, who saw a 16% increase in their business from 2019 to 2020.

In the spring of 2022, the world was again faced with a tragedy when the Russian military started to invade Ukraine on February 24. The war in Ukraine had many consequences on global trade, and therefore also meant that Danish Shipping has been faced with new challenges in the form of the large sanctions which the EU implemented against Russia. This has influenced parts of the Danish Shipping industry who have trading partners etc. in Russia.

== Work ==
=== International trade policy ===
Danish Shipping’s global identity is reflected in the fact that European routes only cover less than a third of Danish shipping companies’ turnover. The rest of the turnover is generated from international activities spread out in the rest of the world, where in the USA, China, Japan and Africa are the largest markets.

Danish Shipping is especially present in the lobbying for the better condition for the shipping industry in the EU and has increasingly strengthened its work in Brussels in accordance with the EU’s growing importance in the world. Danish Shipping lobbies for a more flexible approach to the single Market structure, as they argue that it is not a one-size-fits-all when it comes to a globalised industry such as shipping. According to Danish Shipping, this has led the EU to follow a less protectionist trade policy and open market

Besides the work in international organisations such as the EU and UN, another important part of Danish Shipping’s work with international free trade conditions is maintaining good interrelation between shipowners, authorities, and governments. This is especially reflected in the strong relationship Danish Shipping has with the Danish Maritime Authority, who they work closely together with to make conditions that can create a strong merchant fleet with high quality, as it is seen in the policy paper they have presented together called “The Blue Denmark”. Even though this relationship is more or less institutionalized by frequent meetings between the authority and Danish Shipping, and official hearings, the full nature of this relationship is hard to cover

=== Piracy ===
The relationship between international trade and international security has increasingly been interlinked as globalisation has become evident. This relationship can especially be seen in the matter of piracy which has become a matter of high politics in Denmark for example, as reflected in the foreign policy- and security strategy 2022, where anti-piracy and global trade plays a central part. The threat of piracy imposes big challenges to international shipping and trade, and it costs Danish shipping companies almost a billion kroner per year in security measures to prevent piracy attacks. As a result, Danish Shipping works closely together with the Danish defence and in international arenas to prevent piracy around the world. The work consists among other things of participation in political forums, meetings with relevant political organisations over the world and by involvement in local projects. Danish Shipping has for example been a central advocate and actor in the Danish anti-piracy work in the Horn of Africa, and lately in highly criticized Danish mission the Gulf of Guinea with the frigate Esbern Snarre.

== Building ==
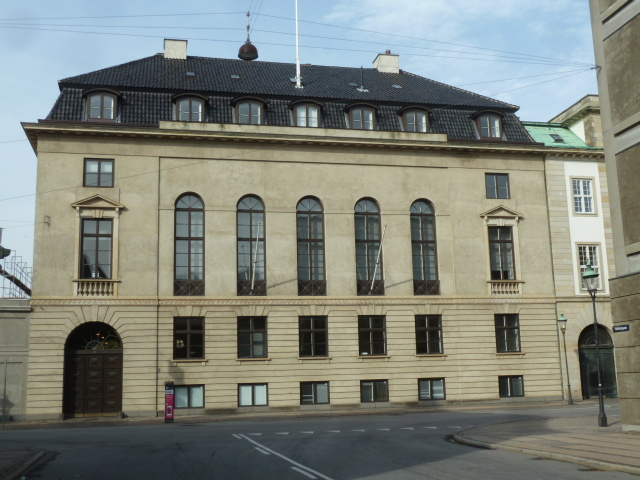
The head office on Amaliegade

The association is headquartered on Amaliegade on the Frederiksstaden of central Copenhagen. The building was completed in 1923 to a design by Emanuel Monberg. It was listed in 2000. The secretariat of Global Maritime Forum is based on the first floor of the building.

== Board ==
Board members are:

- Carsten Mortensen – CEO, Dampskibsselskabet Norden (chairman)
- Claus V. Hemmingsen – CEO, Maersk Drilling and Maersk FPSOs
- Niels Smedegaard – CEO, DFDS
- Jacob Meldgaard – CEO, Torm
- Jan Kastrup-Nielsen – CEO, J. Lauritzen A/S

== Members ==
Danish Shipowners' Association organizes 40 shipping companies and two owners of offshore facilities. Half of the association members have ships sailing under Danish flag while the other half operate from Denmark but sail under flags of other state.

== See also ==
- N. Schiøtt & Hochbrandt
- Søe-Assurance Compagniet
