= Great Belt Bridge rail accident =

2019 Danish rail accident with eight deaths

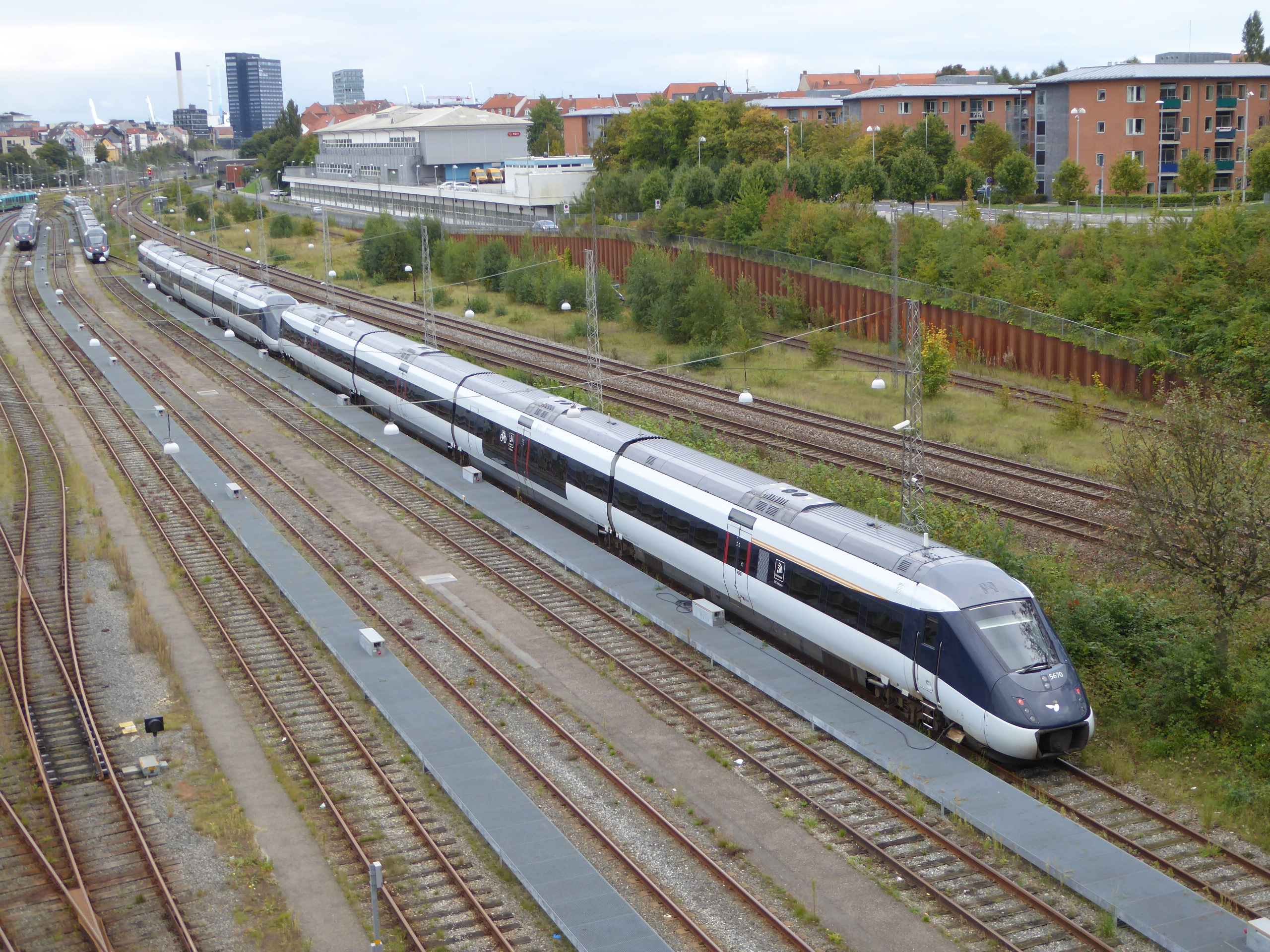
- Ansaldo Breda IC4 diesel multiple units similar to those involved in the accident

Details
- Date: 2 January 2019; 07:35 (CET)
- Location: West Bridge, Great Belt Fixed Link
- Coordinates: 55.301190°N 10.859880°E
- Country: Denmark
- Line: Copenhagen–Fredericia/Taulov Line
- Operator: DSB (passenger train); DB Cargo (freight train)
- Service: InterCityLyn (express train)
- Incident type: Collision
- Cause: Collision with semi-trailer from cargo train

Statistics
- Trains: 2
- Passengers: 131
- Crew: 4
- Deaths: 8
- Injured: 16

The Great Belt Bridge rail accident occurred on 2 January 2019 on the Great Belt Fixed Link in Denmark when a passenger train collided with a semi-trailer from or on a passing freight train. The Great Belt Fixed Link is an 18 km (11 mi) long bridge–tunnel connection between the Danish islands of Zealand and Funen, and the accident happened on the West Bridge, near Funen. The accident happened during a storm, which had closed down the bridge for road traffic, but not for rail traffic. Eight passengers were killed, all Danish citizens, and 16 were injured, making it the deadliest rail accident in Denmark since 1988.

An early investigation found that in some cases, wagons similar to the one involved in the accident failed to lock the semi-trailers in place. A full investigation was published several months later and it confirmed the earlier results. The Danish Transport Authority temporarily banned this kind of wagon until extra locking procedures were put in place, and have tightened the rules for freight on the bridge during windy weather. Shortly after, temporary measures to avoid similar accidents were introduced throughout Europe and permanent measures were introduced in early 2020.

In January 2021 the use of pocket wagons was again suspended in Denmark, following an incident on the same bridge when a semi-trailer had shifted position, and had protruded beyond the side of its freight wagon.

== Accident ==
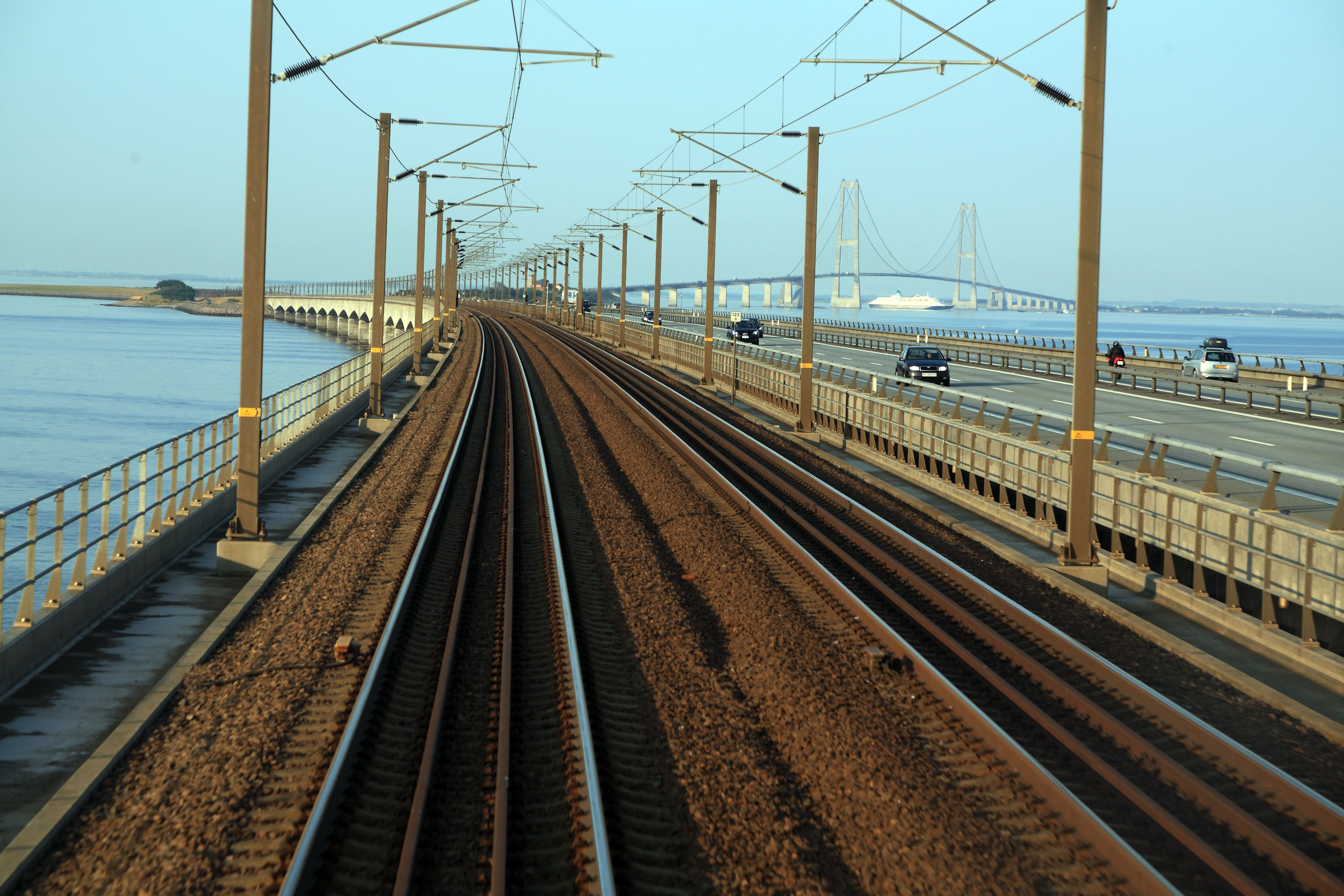
The railway on the West Bridge, as viewed towards Sprogø and the East Bridge. The passenger train was on the southern track to the right; the freight train on the northern track to the left.

Due to Storm Alfrida, which hit Denmark on 1 January 2019, the Danish Road Directorate closed the Great Belt Bridge for all road traffic on the night between 1 and 2 January. It was expected to reopen at 11:00 a.m. on 2 January. Rail traffic was not restricted. Both road and rail traffic travel by the West Bridge, a low box girder bridge, but the more wind-exposed East Bridge, a suspension bridge, is only for road traffic, as trains here travel by tunnel.

At 07:11 a.m., InterCity express ICL 210 departed from Odense headed for Copenhagen. Operated by DSB, it was carrying 131 passengers and a crew of three when it arrived at the western end of the bridge. Meanwhile, a freight train operated by DB Cargo with a crew of one, loaded with semi-trailers carrying crates of empty bottles belonging to Carlsberg, was heading in the opposite direction towards the Carlsberg brewery at Fredericia, 72 kilometres (45 mi) to the north west of the crash site.

Shortly before 07:35 a.m., on the West Bridge of the Great Belt Fixed Link, between the islands of Sprogø and Funen, the passenger train collided with an object initially believed to be a tarpaulin from the freight train, but later that same day identified by Accident Investigation Board Denmark to be an empty semi-trailer from the freight train. The train driver has since said that he noticed sparks lower than usual (i.e. not from the overhead catenary) and that "something big" was hanging from the approaching freight train.

The storm and the location of the crash complicated the emergency operation. Initially, six casualties were confirmed while the trains were still on the bridge, but after they had been moved to a secluded area, two more bodies were found in the passenger train. Both in relation to the accident and the ongoing storm, the government crisis management organization, the National Operative Staff (NOST) decided to convene.

Eight passengers were killed, five women and three men, and 16 were injured in the accident. None of the wounded had life-threatening injuries: 14 had minor injuries, and 2 had moderate injuries. On 4 January, all victims had been identified as Danish citizens, between 27 and 60 years old.

The bridge reopened for road traffic at approximately 12:20 on 2 January. Later that afternoon, the westbound carriageway was briefly closed due to queueing by curious drivers. Rail traffic was restarted at 10:40 a.m. on 3 January, when one track opened, and all traffic was normal by the evening.

== Investigation ==
The investigation was handled by the Accident Investigation Board Denmark. On 2 January 2019, shortly after the accident, investigator Bo Haaning said the accident was caused by a collision between the passenger train and an empty semi-truck from the freight train. However, he stated that details surrounding this were still uncertain: "It [the trailer] either hit the train, or the train drove into it". The full investigation could take up to a year.

Initial media speculation focused on the weather conditions. At the time of the accident, gusts were measured to be up to 20.9 m/s (47 mph) with sustained wind speeds lower. The wind was coming from the north, perpendicular to the bridge. If 10 minute sustained wind speeds had exceeded 21 m/s (47 mph), the speed limit for freight trains would have been decreased from 120 to 80 km/h (75 to 50 mph), and by 25 m/s (56 mph), all traffic would have been cancelled. Since no limits were exceeded, no restrictions were imposed. Both Banedanmark, operators of the Danish railways, and Sund & Bælt, operators of the bridge, said that all procedures had been followed. According to Jacob Mann, professor in wind energy at DTU, the wind cannot be the only cause of the accident.

The media also focused on whether the semi-trailer was properly secured to the rail wagon. On this type of wagon, a pocket wagon, the front of a semi-trailer is fixed only with its kingpin. The back of the semi-trailer is kept in place as the wheels are lowered into a "pocket". Following the accident, operator DB Cargo temporarily suspended all freight trains carrying bottle crates. The accident resembled an incident in Hamburg, Germany, where a semi-truck that was not properly secured had been dislodged and collided with a bridge pier. The European Union Agency for Railways is supposed to forward information relating to serious incidents, but Danish authorities had not been informed about the German accident prior to the Danish accident.

On 5 January 2019, the Danish Transport Authority issued a warning about pocket wagons used to transport semi-trailers, on the recommendation of the Accident Investigation Board Denmark, stating that the locking mechanism securing the trailer could pose a safety risk. It also requested the Joint Network Secretariat (JNS) to open a formal procedure. On 7 January 2019, a test at DB Cargo showed that, after a semi-trailer had been loaded and secured, it could still be lifted off the wagon. The freight train had been checked prior to departure, and seemed to have been properly secured. The following day, the national transport authority temporarily prohibited the use of pocket wagons to transport semi-trailers until extra locking procedures were put in place, and tightened the rules for freight trains crossing the Great Belt, with respect to wind conditions. Shortly after, temporary measures to avoid similar accidents were introduced throughout the continent by the European Union Agency for Railways.

=== Final report ===
On 18 December 2019, the investigation board published its final report on the accident. It concluded that its cause was that the semi-trailer was not locked in place, and that improper maintenance was the reason for it not working. The locking mechanism needs regular lubrication, but the official guidelines were incomplete, resulting in insufficient lubrication of some of its parts. At the same time, there was uncertainty about who was responsible for this part of the maintenance (whether it was DB that leased and operated the freight train wagon, or VTG Rail that owned it). If the locking mechanism had been properly functioning, the wind would not have been able to loosen the semi-truck from the freight train. As a result of the investigation, new guidelines on the maintenance of such locking mechanisms were expected to be implemented throughout Europe in early 2020.

=== Evidence tampering ===
Shortly after the accident, a union representative of DB Cargo crossed out the name of a colleague who had checked the loaded freight train before departure. He said he crossed out the name because that was not the person who performed the check. The representative was suspended on 11 January 2019, and dismissed by DB Cargo in May 2019. He was later given a 20-day suspended sentence for evidence tampering; the judgment was upheld in an appeal.

== See also ==
- List of rail accidents (2010–2019)
- Rail transport in Denmark
