= Westinghouse brakes =

Westinghouse Brakes may refer to:

- A Railway air brake
- Westinghouse Air Brake Company (WABCO) - US
- Westinghouse Brakes - UK
