= Kongsberg Spacetec =

Coordinates: 69.66196°N 18.94225°E

Kongsberg Spacetec AS
- Company type: Subsidiary
- Industry: Space, Information technology
- Founded: 1984
- Defunct: January 1, 2019
- Fate: Merged with Kongsberg Defence & Aerospace
- Headquarters: Tromsø, Norway
- Area served: World
- Products: MEOS Polar Ground Station
- Services: IT consulting, Satellite ground stations and software, Synthetic Aperture Radar (SAR) systems
- Revenue: NOK 66 million (2011)
- Operating income: NOK 4.5 million (2011)
- Owner: Kongsberg Defence & Aerospace
- Number of employees: 56 (2011)

Kongsberg Spacetec AS or KSPT or Spacetec A/S, is a supplier of space ground systems and services. The company is now a part of Kongsberg Defence & Aerospace's Space & Surveillance division. The ground stations division is based in Tromsø, Norway. The division is co-located with Kongsberg Satellite Services (KSAT), formerly Tromsø Satellite Station (TSS).

== History ==
The company was established by some of the most experienced employees of Tromsø Satellite Station, which had been operating since 1967. They originally established Drive Electronics in 1982, but it went bankrupt two years later. The company was re-established as Spacetec, which was registered on 11 December 1984. The company was established with a share capital of NOK 5 million or NOK 1,000 per share. Along with Norsk Data, Computas, Informasjonskontroll and Noratom, Spacetec established the joint venture Norspace to act as supplier to the European Space Agency. By 1986, the company had eighteen employees. It received a state subsidy of NOK 6.25 million to finance its expansion.

This resulted in a contract to deliver a ground station system to Esrange in Kiruna, Sweden. The Norwegian Defence Research Establishment developed an application of synthetic-aperture radar for satellites at this was to be commercialized by Spacetec and Norsk Data. In July 1988, the company signed a contract to deliver equipment worth NOK 26 million to TSS in partnership with Norsk Data. This involved Spacetec designing a downlink and image processing software for ERS-1 which needed to be capable of handling 100 megabits per second. The new ground station was to be completed in 1989 and operational by April 1990. Also in 1988, Norspace signed an agreement to deliver telemetry components for ESA's Columbus module for the International Space Station. In December Spacetec signed an agreement with ESA to develop a system to transfer satellite data from magnetic tapes to optical discs.

During 1989, Spacetec participated in a cooperation with TSS and the University of Tromsø in developing technology to send satellite images to customers in the course of minutes, rather than hours and days, through the use of broadband. After ten years of development, the Norwegian Defence Research Establishment launched its CESAR supercomputer, which was tailor-made for analysis of SAR images and had been developed in cooperation with Spacetec. It allowed for the analysis of a 100 by 100 square kilometers (39 by 39 sq mi) surface area in eight minutes. In November 1990, Spacetec signed an agreement with ESA to develop and supply a simulator to test and verify the launching ramp of the Ariane 5 rockets. Spacetec cooperated with the Norwegian Meteorological Institute to develop a processing system for the latter to utilize satellite data for meteorology. With two years of development, Spacetec planned to sell the technology to other users. In 1993, Spacetec signed an agreement with ESA to deliver telemetry systems to ERS-2.

In 1991, the company had 38 employees, of which 30 were engineers. It had a revenue of NOK 28 million and a net income of NOK 2.9 million. One sixth of the company was owned by various employees, while the remaining was owned by various industrial companies in Tromsø. The largest were Odd Berg Gruppen (29 percent) and Sparebanken Nord-Norge (18 percent). Norsk Forsvarsteknologi (NFT) made an unsuccessful attempt to purchase Spacetec in December 1993, with a price of NOK 1300 per share. Negotiations with the main shareholders followed and by March NFT had bought the company at a price of NOK 1,550 per share, NOK 7.75 million in total.

In August 1994, Spacetect signed a contract for parts of a new ground station in Singapore. In September 1995, Spacetec started a cooperation with the French company Thomson to develop systems for the European Organisation for the Exploitation of Meteorological Satellites. In November, a subsidiary was established which would work with processing medical X-ray images. Spacetec participated with technology for the Solar and Heliospheric Observatory.

In 1996, the Norwegian Space Center started negotiations with NASA to provide a ground station for the Earth Observing System (EOS) in Longyearbyen. Svalbard Satellite Station was established in 1997 and was owned by Kongsberg/Lockheed Martin Space Data Services, a joint venture between Kongsberg Spacetec and Lockheed Martin. That year Kongsberg Spacetec had a revenue of NOK 42 million and they announced that they would focus on receiving contracts in Asia and South America. Throughout the 1990s, Kongsberg Spacetec had a fairly stable revenue and an annual profit of between NOK 2 and 3 million. In 1997, Kongsberg moved ten employees working on a radar system to Tromsø and co-located them with Spacetec. Spacetec experienced a major revenue increase from 1999 to 2002, to more than NOK 60 million. However, they were not able to increase their profits. After three years development of new weather satellite technology, Spacetec won a contract worth NOK 50 million in September 2002 for Meteosat 8.

In 2002, ownership and operations of the facility were consolidated and taken over by the newly created Kongsberg Satellite Services. Lockheed Martin was no longer interested in owning a share of the facility, and sold their shares. NSC and Kongsberg merged their interests in the new company, which also took over Tromsø Satellite Station. By 2004, six antennas, between 9 and 13 meters (30 and 43 ft) in diameter, had been installed. Spacetec had its break-through with NASA in September 2006, when it signed an agreement to deliver twenty-two ground stations to Goddard Space Flight Center in a contract worth NOK 19 million.

Tromsø Centre for Remote Technology was established in February 2008 as a cooperation between Spacetec, KSAT, UiT and the Northern Research Institute. The goal of the project was to create closer ties between research and commercial activity within satellite communication technology.

Supplier of the framework for the portal BarentsWatch. The agreement was signed in September 2011.

In 2024, Kongsberg secured contracts with the Norwegian Intelligence Service for maritime surveillance satellites, as well as with NASA.

== Customers ==
- European Space Agency (ESA)
- EUMETSAT
- RADARSAT-2 processor (MDA)
- Envisat ASAR processor
- NASA Goddard Space Flight Center
- Norwegian Meteorological Institute
- Planck – Low Frequency Instrument
- UK Met Office
- KSAT
- GlobICE project
- Chinese Academy of Science
- Norwegian Computing Center
- KNMI
- NORUT IT
- The ESA/ESRIN ATSR Browse Generation System (ABS)
- ICEMON
- EuroClim
- BarentsWatch
