= Danish Maritime Authority =

Agency of the Danish Government

- Søfartsstyrelsen
- Logo of the Danish Maritime Authority

Agency overview
- Formed: 1988
- Headquarters: Korsør
- Agency executive: Andreas Nordslett
- Parent agency: Ministry of Industry, Business, and Financial Affairs
- Website: dma.dk

The Danish Maritime Authority (Danish: Søfartsstyrelsen) is the agency of the Danish Government responsible for regulating and administrating Danish maritime affairs. The Danish Maritime Authority (DMA) is part of the Ministry of Industry, Business, and Financial Affairs (Danish: Erhvervsministeriet). The Agency consists of the central authority and eight vision offices, including the office in Nuuk and the Centre for Maritime Health on Fanø. Its headquarters are in Korsør.

The Danish Maritime Authority manages the administration of Danish shipping, safety on board and sailing safety in Danish and Greenlandic waters, education of seafarers, ship registration, and maritime and business policy for the shipping industry both nationally and internationally.

== History ==
The Danish Maritime Authority was set up in 1988 through the merger of six existing maritime agencies and bodies (the State Ships Inspection, the Directorate for Seafarers, the Directorate for the Maritime Training Programme, the Register of Shipping, the Welfare Office, and the State Ice Service). Thorkild Funder was the first Director-General, succeeded by Jørgen Hammer Hansen in 1996. A government initiative in 2015 decided that the Agency would relocate to Korsør in 2017.

1988: Six Danish maritime institutions merge (the State Ships Inspection; the Directorate for Seafarers; the Directorate for the Maritime Training Programme; the Register of Shipping; the Welfare Office; and the State Ice Service) to become the Danish Maritime Authority. Thorkild Funder becomes the first Director-General. The Danish International Register of Shipping (DIS) was set up.

1996: Jørgen Hammer Hansen becomes the new Director-General of the Danish Maritime Authority. The report: "A future for Danish shipping" was presented by the Funder Committee.

2000: "The Act on the Danish International Register of Shipping" was amended. It became possible to admit passenger ships engaged in foreign trade to the DIS.

2001: All maritime training programs became private foundations. The tonnage taxation scheme is introduced.

2003: "A shipping growth strategy" was published by the Danish Maritime Authority, and industry presents its recommendations for future recruiting and training programmes.

2006: The action plan "Denmark as Europe's leading shipping nation" is published.

2009: Andreas Nordseth succeeds Jørgen Hammer Hansen as Director General of the Agency.

2011: The Danish Maritime Authority takes over most of the abolished Danish Maritime Safety Administration's tasks, such as aids to navigation and lights, navigational information, and navigation warnings, and the Danish Pilotage Authority (Danish: Lodtilsynet). When the Danish Maritime Safety Administration (DaMSA) (Danish: Farvandsvæsnet) was abolished, most of its former responsibilities was incorporated into the Danish Maritime Authority. Responsibility for the supervision of the maritime educations were allocated to the Ministry of Higher Education and Science (Danish: Uddannelses- og Forskingsministeriet).

2012: The "Plan for Growth in Blue Denmark" was published.

2013: The Danish Maritime Authority was reallocated to a new location on Carl Jacobsens Vej in Valby.

2015: A government initiative reallocated several agencies away from Copenhagen. Danish Maritime Authority would relocate to Korsør effective 2017.

2017: The headquarters of the Danish Maritime Authority and fifty employees were relocated to temporary premises at Fjordvænget 30 in Korsør, as announced in 2015.

2019: The Danish Maritime Authority was fully set up in Korsør. The new headquarter of the Danish Maritime Authority is fully set up at three addresses in Korsør, with the main address at Caspar Brands Plads 9. The two other locations are at Fjordvænget 30 and Batterivej 7.

== Structure ==
The Danish Maritime Authority consists of approximately three hundred employees. Two hundred of those are found at its headquarters in Korsør in Western Sealand. The remaining employees are found throughout the country, and on board the inspectorship POUL LØWENØRN. The Danish Maritime Authority consists of twelve departments with separate areas of responsibility.

Department	Danish	Responsibility
The Secretariat of Administration	Administrastionssekretariatet (ADM)	Management of finances, staff, technical aids, and physical frameworks.
The Executive Office	Direktionssekretariatet (DIS)	Matters relating to the executive management, the ministry and the ministry, and the portal for press and media. [1] [1] Danish Maritime Authority. (n.d.). Executive office. Danish Maritime Authority. Retrieved May 26, 2022, from https://dma.dk/about-us/organisation/sections/executive-office
IT Operations and Development	IT-Drift og Udvikling (IDU)	The usage, maintenance, and development of the enterprise resource planning systems, in line with the digitization strategy. [1] [1] Danish Maritime Authority. (n.d.). IT operations and development. Danish Maritime Authority. Retrieved May 26, 2022, from https://dma.dk/about-us/organisation/sections/it-operations-and-development-idu
Climate and Green Transition	Klima og grøn omstilling (KOGO)	The climate area and work on the green transition, national and international climate negotiations. [1] [1] Danish Maritime Authority. (n.d.). Climate and green transition. Danish Maritime Authority. Retrieved May 26, 2022, from https://dma.dk/about-us/organisation/sections/climate-and-green-transition
Quality and Data Management	Kvalitets-og datastyringsenheden (KDE)	The assistance of the executing management to ensure that operations are managed, administrated, and documented following relevant strategies, regulations, and policies. [1] [1] Danish Maritime Authority. (n.d.). Quality and data management. Danish Maritime Authority. Retrieved May 26, 2022, from https://dma.dk/about-us/organisation/sections/quality-and-data-management
Management and Operations Development	Ledelses-og Forretningsudvikling (LOF)	Combines various strategic staff functions and projects, each of which assists the executive management in management and operations developments. [1] [1] Danish Maritime Authority. (n.d.). Management and operations development. Danish Maritime Authority. Retrieved May 26, 2022, from https://dma.dk/about-us/organisation/sections/management-and-operations-development
Blue Growth and Maritime Policy	Maritime erhvervs-og vækstpolitik (MEV)	Shipping policy, national and international maritime growth policy, and the development and implementation of the Maritime Spatial Plan (MSP). [1] [1] Danish Maritime Authority. (n.d.). Blue Growth and maritime policy. Danish Maritime Authority. Retrieved May 26, 2022, from https://dma.dk/about-us/organisation/sections/blue-growth-and-maritime-policy
Maritime Regulation and Legal Affairs	Maritime regulering og jura (MRJ)	Update and make laws and regulations easily understandable within the Agency's area of responsibility. [1] [1] Danish Maritime Authority. (n.d.). Maritime Regulation and Legal Affairs. Danish Maritime Authority. Retrieved May 26, 2022, from https://dma.dk/about-us/organisation/sections/maritime-regulation-and-legal-affairs
Safety of Navigation, National Waters	Sikre farvande (SIFA)	Safety in navigation, including buoyage, navigation aids, and the Danish pilotage system in Danish, Greenlandic, and Faroese waters, and use of technology. [1] [1] Danish Maritime Authority. (n.d.). Safety of navigation, national waters. Danish Maritime Authority. Retrieved May 26, 2022, from https://dma.dk/about-us/organisation/sections/safety-of-navigation-national-waters
Ship Survey, Certification and Manning	Sikre Skibe (SISK)	Administration and enforcement of rules governing Danish shipbuilding, equipment, and operation, in line with levels of safety, health, and environmental protection. [1] [1] Danish Maritime Authority. (n.d.). Ship survey, certification, and Manning. Danish Maritime Authority. Retrieved May 26, 2022, from https://dma.dk/about-us/organisation/sections/ship-survey-certification-and-manning
Danish Ship Registration	Skibsregistrering (SRG)	Correct registration of rights, registration of Danish and Greenlandic ships and vessels, and development of registration over time. [1] [1] Danish Maritime Authority. (n.d.). Danish ship register. Danish Maritime Authority. Retrieved May 26, 2022, from https://dma.dk/about-us/organisation/sections/danish-ship-register
Seafarers, Certification and Social Affairs	Søfarende of certifikater (SOC)	The management and development of the social aspects maritime sector (enforcement of regulations and issuance of certificates for seafarers, fishers, pilots, and yacht masters) and seafarers´ conditions on Danish ships. [1] [1] Danish Maritime Authority. (n.d.). Seafarers, certification, and Social Affairs. Danish Maritime Authority. Retrieved May 26, 2022, from https://dma.dk/about-us/organisation/sections/seafarers-certification-and-social-affairs

=== Board and tribunals ===
The Danish Maritime Authority can revise current legal regulations or create new ones within the maritime field. The following boards that represent both employer and employees' organisations have been set up by the Danish Maritime Authority.

- Danish Ships Inspection Council
- Danish Shipping Tribunal (Danish Appeals Boards Authority)
- Danish Shipping Board
- Danish Maritime Law Committee
- Danish Pleasure Craft Safety Board
- The Liaison Committee for Maritime Research

== Responsibilities ==
The Danish Maritime Authority has performed tasks like ship survey and certification from the beginning. The responsibilities have broadened over the years, including helping the ministry and legislation. When the Danish Maritime Safety Administration (DaMSA) was abolished in 2011, the Danish Maritime Authority took over the management of navigation information and warnings. Today, the Danish Maritime Authority is managing shipping and its framework conditions, the ships, and their crew, and marking on land and in the waters around Denmark.

The Danish Maritime Authority is not the responsible agency for the enterprise policy under the Ministry of Food, Agriculture and Fisheries (Danish: Ministeriet for Fødevarer, Landbrug og Fiskeri). Tasks like maritime surveillance, surveillance of civil shipping, sovereignty enforcement, policy authority, pollution control, environmental monitoring, and icebreaking, belongs to the Ministry of Defence (Danish: Forsvarsministeriet).

=== Areas of Responsibility ===
- Danish ship's construction, equipment, and operation (comprehensive security, terrorist prevention, measures for navigation, staffing, working environment, and environmental protection)
- Port state control of foreign ships in Danish ports
- Ship registration
- Seafarer's employment, health, and maritime social conditions
- Shipping policy, maritime law, and business policy both nationally and internationally
- Tasks relating to marking at sea and on land (lighthouse and buoys) including ships and workshops
- Sailing information in the form of sailing analyses, warnings, GIS, and professional publications
- The state pilotage

=== The Danish Maritime Investigation Board (DMAIB) ===
The Danish Maritime Authority's Division for Investigation of Maritime Accidents was previously responsible for the investigation of maritime accidents. A European Union directive from 2005 asked the member states to set up maritime investigation authorities independent of the maritime administration divisions, causing Denmark to set up a new maritime investigation authority. The Danish Maritime Accident Investigation Board (DMAIB) (Danish: Den Maritime Havarikommission) now manages investigations of maritime accidents. The DMAIB is an independent unit under the Ministry of Industry, Business, and Financial Affairs that investigates accidents related to shipping and fishing.

=== The Danish International Ship Register (DIS) ===
On 23 June 1988, the Danish Parliament (Danish: Folketing) passed Act No. 408 of 1 July 1988 on the Danish International Ship Register (DIS). The DIS was an institutional response passed by the Danish parliament to the shipping cross of the early-to-mid 1980s and the growing challenge of reflagging of ships in the Danish merchant fleet. The introduction of the DIS proved to be a historical landmark in the development of the Danish shipping industry as it meant the gradual revival of its merchant fleet, followed up with extensions and related measures, such as the 2002 tonnage taxation. Today, Danish ships must be registered in the DIS, the Register of Shipping, or the Boat Register.

== Blue Denmark ==
Blue Denmark is a well-known concept in the Danish public that originated in the late 1980s and covers a range of maritime business activities. Blue Denmark consists of shipping companies and a large number of companies whose activities originate from international and Danish shipping (companies that contribute by oil extraction and installation of wind turbines, shipping companies engaged in goods or passengers; Danish ports and freight terminals serving a regional catchment area; freight forwarders and shipbrokers; repair and newbuilding years; industrial companies supplying equipment and components to shipyards worldwide, etc.). The common feature is that the companies have their head office and/or activities in Denmark, and their activity is related to maritime transport or other business at sea. The Danish Maritime Authority publishes statistics on employment and production in the Blue Denmark, as well as plans for growth.

=== Production and Employment in Blue Denmark in 2020 ===
The Danish maritime sector employed 64,413 people in 2020. 38,108 people were employed through the demand for goods and services created by the maritime sector in other sectors. Combining this direct and indirect level of employment, the maritime sector created 3.5 percent of all jobs in Denmark in 2020. The value of exports from the Danish maritime sector was DKK 255 billion, constituting 24.6 percent of the total Danish export of goods and services.

=== International Cooperation in Blue Denmark ===
==== European Union (EU) ====
As a member of the European Union, the EU is the most important regional forum for Danish shipping. The Danish Maritime Authority is the Chairman of the Government's EU special committee on shipping policy. The EU is a priority for Denmark, as the EU´ has a strong ability to compete with other regions and provides framework conditions in the maritime field. The Director-General of the Danish Maritime Authority is Denmark's representative in the European Maritime Safety Agency (EMSA), set up in 2002.

===== EU Baltic Sea Strategy =====
On behalf of the other Baltic Sea countries, The Danish Maritime Authority coordinates two Policy Areas together with Finland– the Policy Areas on Clean Shipping (PA Ship) and the Policy Area on Maritime Safety and Security (PA Safe) - under the EU Strategy for the Baltic Sea Region (EUSBSR).

==== International Maritime Organization (IMO) ====
The International Maritime Organization (IMO) is the United Nations´ body for maritime matters and activities, where the members negotiate and adopt international maritime negotiations. The goal is to strengthen environmental protection, promote the reinforcement of maritime transport (goods and people), and enhance safety at sea. The organisation plays a key role in connection to the Danish Maritime Authority's development of rules and regulations, and Denmark has given its candidature for re-election to the council of IMO 2022–2023. The IMO further manages legal issues related to areas of insurance in connection with pollution, liability, and compensation.

=== The Maritime Spatial Plan (MSP) ===
The Danish Maritime Authority is the responsible authority for developing Denmark's first maritime spatial plan (MSP). As of March 2021, all Danish authorities must follow the regulations and area allocations of the MSP. The framework for the MSP is laid down in the Maritime Spatial Plan Act 1, which implements parts of the Directive of the European Parliament and the Council setting up a framework for maritime spatial planning. The maritime spatial plan covers the entire Danish Sea area, which means the territorial sea and the Exclusive Economic Zone (EEZ). The MSP sets the overall planning framework for the offshore sector, maritime transport, transport infrastructure, fisheries, aquaculture, extraction of mineral resources at sea, land reclamation of major importance for society, and the conversation, protection, and improvement of the environment. The MSP is planning for the following applications and activities: the energy sector at sea; sea transport; transport infrastructure; fisheries and aquaculture; extraction of raw materials at sea; conservation, protection, and improvement of the environment.

==== International Regulations of Maritime Planning ====
The overall framework for marine management and coastal state's management of the sea and its resources is the United Nations Convention on the Law of the Sea (UNCLOS), adopted in 1982 and approved by 167 coastal states. Attached to the Convention on the Law of the Sea is the International Court of Justice (ITLOS) in Hamburg, where conflicts between states over rights and obligations under the Convention on the Law of the Sea may be brought in. [1] [1] As a member of the EU, Denmark is a subject to an addition layer of legislation in relation to marine management. [2] The Act implements the EU Directive 2014/89/EU on the framework for maritime spatial planning, which obliges EU countries to prepare a marine plan.

==== Consultation Rounds ====
A six-month-long public consultation on the Maritime Spatial Plan and the Environmental Assessment was initiated by the Danish Maritime Authority. The consultation round began on 31 March 2021 and ended on 30 September 2021. A total of 256 consultation responses were received from organizations, municipalities, citizens, research institutions, companies, and associations during this period. Several concerns were raised regarding the MSP's impact on activities on land.

===== Tourism in Djursland =====
One debate covered in Danish media has been related to mariculture and tourism off the coast of Djursland, a peninsula on the eastern coast of Denmark surrounded by the Kattegat Sea. The prospects of more mariculture, which is part of the MSP, are considered a threat among citizens and members of the local council on Djursland to tourism activities. Tourism is a key element of the local economy, and there have been concerns in Djursland regarding participation in the decision-making process of the MSP. The mayor of Sydjurs municipality, Ole Bollesen, has expressed hope that the forthcoming MSP consider the interests on land, where among others tourism is important for Djursland.

=== Plan for Growth in Blue Denmark towards 2025 ===
In 2016 the Maritime Strategy team was established by the Danish Maritime Authority, with the intended goal of creating a list of recommendations for how Denmark could maintain its maritime position of strength towards 2025. In 2017 a list of 52 recommendations was presented, covering a wide range of topics both economic and environmental.

These recommendations were initially condensed down to eleven specific recommendations and subsequently turned into four main directions to ensure growth in Blue Denmark: 1) A power hub for digitisation, 2) A power hub with attractive framework conditions, 3) A power hub of knowledge and know-how and 4) A power hub with a global outlook and attractiveness.

==== A power hub for digitisation ====
Denmark, by being on the forefront of digital progress, can reap the rewards and reach its goal of continued growth and market share. And in so doing can eliminate the risk that the Blue Economy in Denmark loses its competitiveness, which in turn would be a great detriment to Denmark as a whole. Specifically the government intends to be at the precipice of innovation of maritime technologies, digital systems, production and operating modes, as well as energy production and achieving this by removing barriers and working closely together with private companies.

==== A power hub with attractive framework conditions ====
To minimize competition from emerging shipping nations and be able to compete on equal footing with other great shipping nations, Denmark has to become a hub with attractive framework conditions. By being transparent and predictable, and supporting the climate conscientious corporations, the Danish government believes it can be an attractive place to do business for both big corporations and workers, and in doing so secure the interests of the blue economy of Denmark.

==== A power hub of knowledge and know-how ====
A big part of Denmark's advantage in the maritime field comes from its availability of its competent and highly skilled workers. This is a prerequisite for further development and high productivity and makes Denmark an attractive place for foreign companies to do business. To ensure this advantage into the foreseeable future, the Danish government intends to increase the possibilities and capabilities of maritime education in Denmark, by working closely with relevant parties in the industry and in doing so becoming a power hub for maritime knowledge and know-how.

==== A power hub with a global outlook and attractiveness ====
To ensure competitiveness, Denmark must, in addition to the first three strategies, increase its visibility and pressens on the global stage. To ensure Denmark's visibility on the global market, free trade is essential, therefore new barriers to trade are problematic and must be fought. Denmark must, through collaboration with like minded nations and close cooperation with the European Union, protect and strengthen free trade. In addition Denmark will continue to use international maritime forums like the International Maritime Organisation to further its own interests like a high climate standard, and show the world that Denmark is a great place to do business. By doing so Denmark helps to ensure its strong position on the global stage and continues to strengthen Danish companies and the blue economy as a whole in Denmark. This is specifically achieved through targeted and ambitious marketing and strengthening global collaboration.

== Safety at Sea ==
The Danish Maritime Authority manages a wide number of tasks related to aids to navigation and regulation of areas of importance to support a high safety level.

=== The Arctic Region ===
Navigational safety in Greenland waters and the Arctic region are two of the Danish Maritime Authority's key areas of interest, especially with the rapid increase of voyages by ship in the Arctic areas. The Danish Maritime Authority has also worked to get special international regulations on navigation in polar regions in fora such as the Arctic Council and the International Maritime Organisation (IMO).

==== Greenland ====
The Greenlandic coastline is approximately 44.000 kilometres and sparsely populated with a limited infrastructure. To strengthen maritime safety in Greenlandic waters, the Danish Maritime Authority is in dialogue with the Greenland Home Rule Government about new initiatives. A working group in the Arctic Council is also examining the possibility for strengthening cooperation among the Arctic states to enhance sailing safety. Greenland has been assessing whether to bring the maritime political area to Greenland and except it from the responsibilities of the Danish Maritime Authority.

==== ArcticInfo ====
ArcticInfo (former: ArcticWeb) is a service offered by the Norwegian Coastal Administration through BarentsWatch. It is aimed at helping fishing boats, cruise traffic, and research and expedition vessels, dominating traffic in Arctic areas. The platform is a joint regional project operational since 2014, with the main target group as cruise and passenger ships running in Greenlandic waters. The Danish Maritime Authority informed on 1 June 2018 that it transferred the responsibility of ArcticInfo to Norway, and the Norwegian Coastal Administration has taken over the ownership and operation of the web platform. ArcticInfo was developed in cooperation between the Government of Greenland, the Norwegian Coastal Administration, the Danish Meteorological Institute (DMI), the Danish Geodata Agency, Joint Arctic Command, Defence Centre for Operational Oceanography, and the Danish Maritime Authority.

==== Danish Maritime Cybersecurity Unit ====
The Danish Maritime Authority manages cyber and information security in the maritime sector. This includes maritime safety in Danish waters and safety on board Danish ships, as well as ships systems and software for the ship's operation, traffic monitoring, warning, and information for shipping. The Danish Maritime Authority set up the Danish Maritime Cybersecurity Unit in 2019, which provides advice and serves as a point of communication within the field of cyber and information security for the Danish maritime sector with an internal function at the Danish Maritime Authority. It also functions as an exchange point between actors of the maritime sector and the Center for Cyber Security (CDCS). The Danish Maritime Authority's strategic aim with the sub-strategy for cyber and information security is that cyber-attacks do not get to compromise security for Danish ships and in Danish waters.

==== Piracy ====
The Danish Maritime Authority and other maritime institutions around the world have increased focus on the global challenge of piracy, as Denmark has significant maritime interests in keeping international waters safe and navigable for Danish and international shipping. Denmark has been an active driving force in preventing piracy activities on the African continent since 2008, particularly on the Horn of Africa and the Gulf of Guinea. Considering the international trade that goes through the Indian Ocean and the Red Sea, safe and secure navigation in the waters around the Horn of Africa is important for Danish shipping. The Danish government's Priority paper for the Danish efforts to combat and other types of maritime crime covering the period from 2019 to 2020 describes the long-term priorities.

== Environment and Climate ==
=== The Maritime Spatial Plan (MSP) ===
The Maritime Spatial Plan (MSP) supports the aim of the Climate Act to reduce Danish CO_{2} by being Europe's most ambitious user of offshore wind energy. Denmark will construct new offshore wind farms and energy islands, which will help Denmark to follow the Paris Agreement from 2015 and reduce greenhouse gas emissions. The target is a 70% reduction of CO_{2} in 2030, and full climate neutrality in 2050. The MSP is supporting the United Nations´ goals affected by maritime spatial planning.

=== Zero-Emission Shipping Mission ===
The Danish Maritime Authority and Mc-Kinney Møller Center for Zero Carbon Shipping signed a "Knowledge Partnership Agreement" in April 2022, where the two parties have committed to knowledge sharing and joint work towards a decarbonized shipping industry. The "Zero-Emission Shipping Mission" initiative is led by the states of Norway, the United States, and Denmark (led by the Danish Maritime Authority), Global Maritime Forum, and Mærsk Mc-Kinney Møller Center for Zero Carbon Shippon. By 2030 the Zero-Emission Shipping Mission aims to introduce into the global fleet commercially practical vessels that run on zero-emission fuels, scale-up efficient production of zero-emission fuels and set up global port infrastructure to support vessels running on zero-emissions fuels.

== See also ==
- Accident Investigation Board Denmark
