= Amaliegade =

Street in central Copenhagen, Denmark

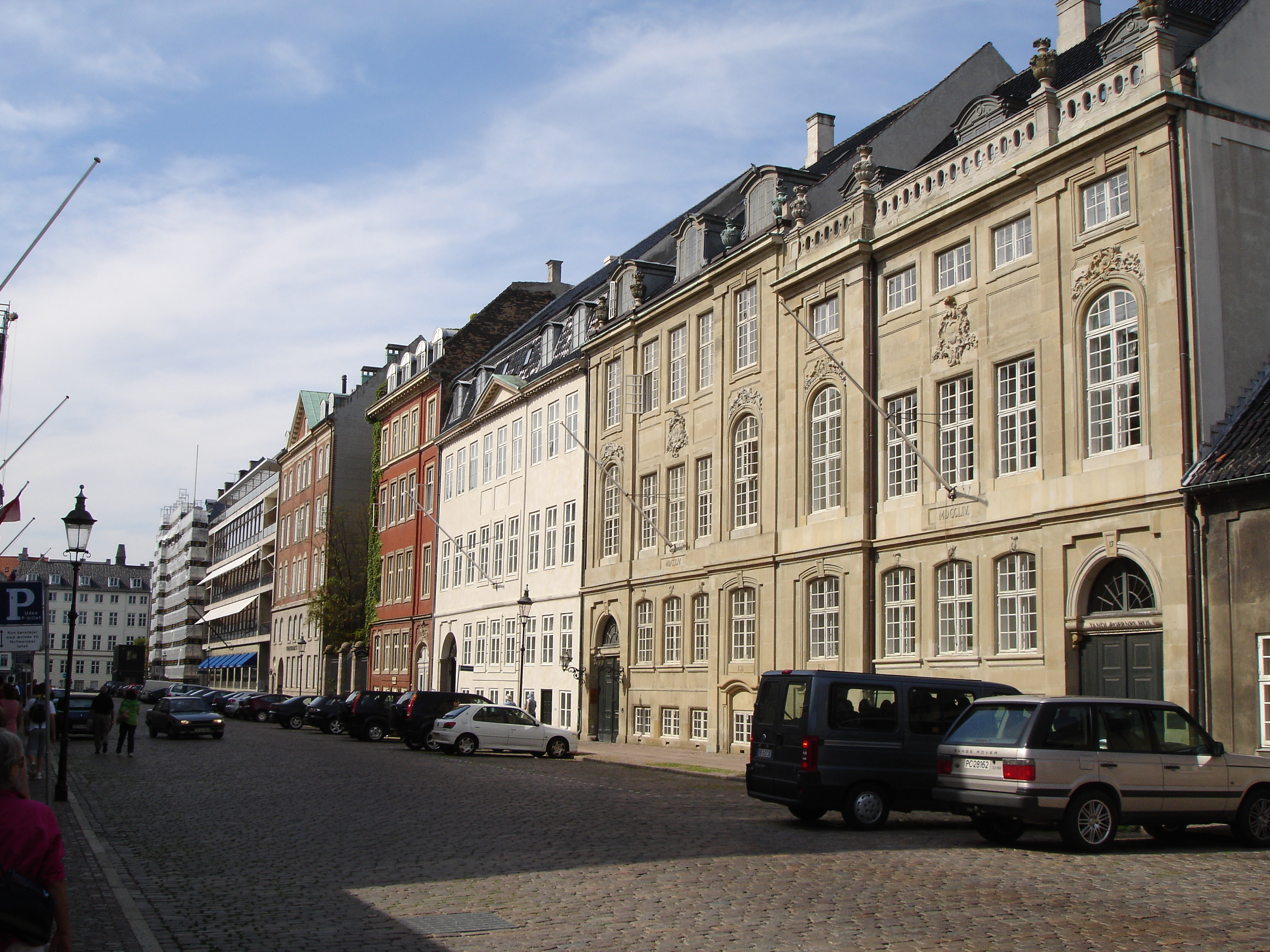
- The southern part of the street
- Interactive map of Amaliegade
- Length: 780 m (2,560 ft)
- Location: Indre By, Copenhagen, Denmark
- Postal code: 1256
- Coordinates: 55°40′42.96″N 12°34′38.64″E

Amaliegade (Danish pronunciation: [æˈmɛˀljəˌkɛːðə]) is a street in central Copenhagen, Denmark, which makes up the longer of the two axes on which the Rococo district Frederiksstaden is centred. Amaliegade extends from Sankt Annæ Plads to Esplanaden, passing through the central plaza of Amalienborg Palace on the way, where it intersects Frederiksgade, the other, shorter but more prominent, axis of the district.

The street is dominated by a number of elegant mansions, most of which are from the second half of the 18th century. At Amalienborg Palace, Amaliegade is spanned by a colonnade. Designed by royal architect Caspar Frederik Harsdorff, it was built in 1794–1795 to connect Moltke's Palace, the residence of the king, to Schack's Palace where the crown prince resided.

== Notable buildings ==
=== No. 9: Collin's House ===
Collin's House (Danish. Den Collinske Gård) was built in 1751–1752 for bootmaker Peder Svendsen. The house breaks with schematic guidelines stipulated by Eigtved. It is receded from the street. Jonas Collin, a prominent citizen of his day, lived in the house from 1839–1861. During those years, Hans Christian Andersen was a frequent visitor to the house.

=== No. 15–17 ===
Built 1754–1756, these were designed by Nicolai Eigtved as two symmetrical houses, one of which has an extra floor.

=== No. 18: The Yellow Mansion ===
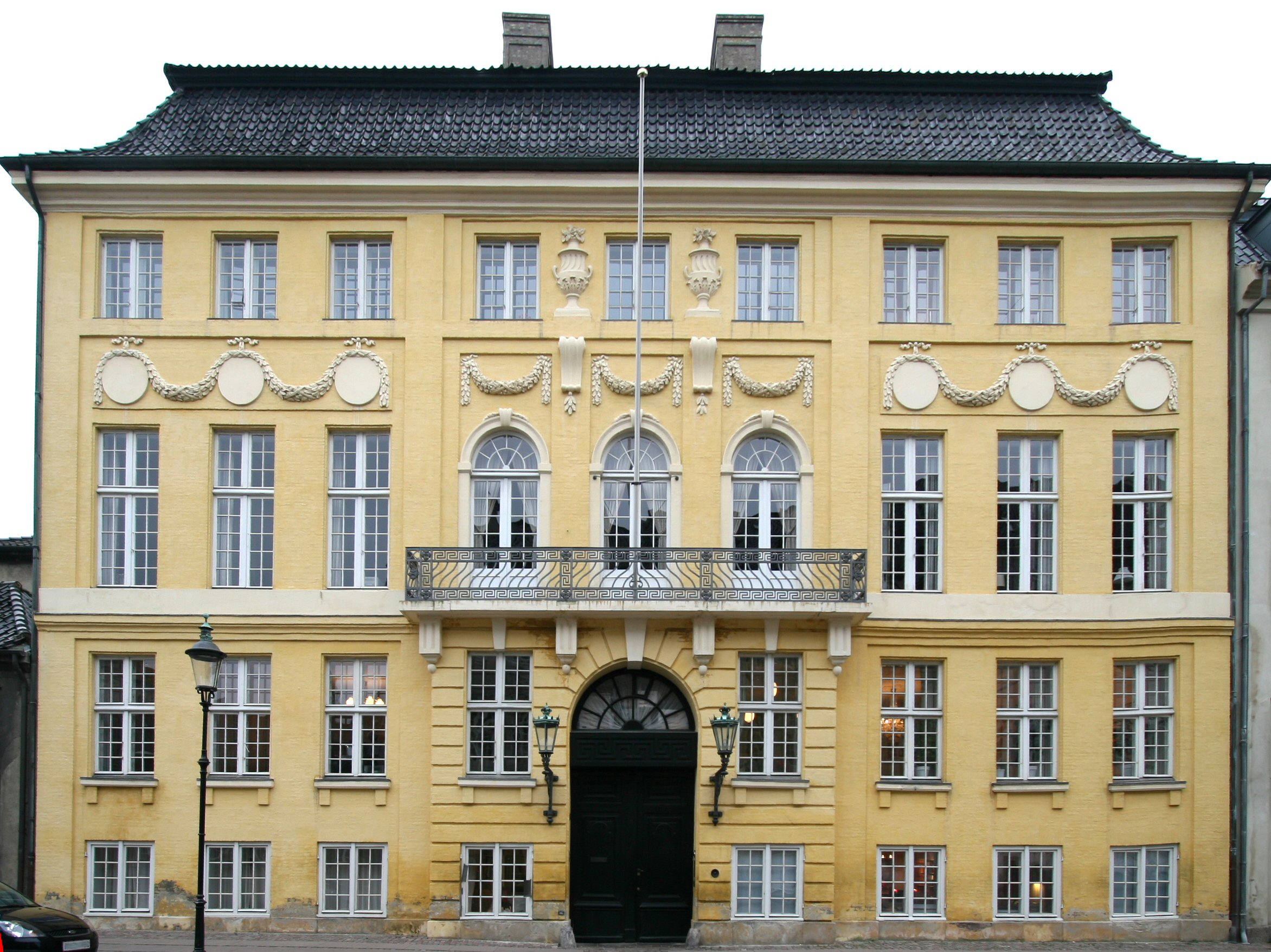
The Yellow Palace

The Yellow Palace, or Bergum's Palace, was built 1759–1764 by the architect Nicolas-Henri Jardin for the timber merchant and slave trader H.F. Bargum. It is considered the first example of Neoclassical architecture in Copenhagen. Today it houses the Lord Chamberlain’s Office.

King Frederick VI purchased the palace in 1810 to use it as a guest residence for visiting relatives of the royal family. In 1837 King Frederik VII handed the property over to his nephew Prince Christian of Glücksborg, who later became Christian IX as the first Glücksburg king of Denmark, who took up residence in the building and lived there until moving into Amalienborg Palace in 1865. Prince Valdemar lived in the Yellow Palace until his death in 1939 as its last royal resident.

=== Np. 21 ===
No. 21 is the Italian ambassador's residence in Copenhagen.

=== No. 23 and 23b ===
Amaliegade and 23B are two houses, but the latter is entered through the gateway of the former. Both 23, 23b and the adjoining house at No. 25 are today used by the Danish Social Appeals Board.

No. 23 was designed by Nicolai Eigtved and built 1752–1753 in Rococo style for Mayor Johan Johansen. The house at No. 23b was built as an infill on the empty lot between Eigtved's Rococo house at No. 23 and de Thurah's Baroque house at No. 25 between 1785 and 1787. It was designed by Joseph Guione in Neoclassical style.

=== No. 25: Lauritz de Thurah's House ===
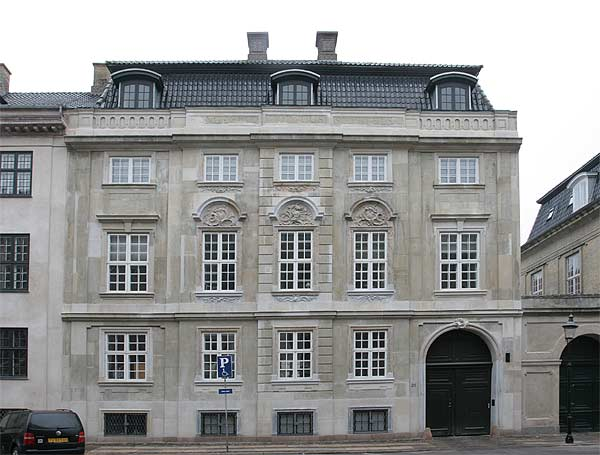
Lauritz de Thurah's house at No. 25

Lauritz de Thurah built this house 1755–1757 for his own use after returning to Copenhagen to direct the redevelopment of the Frederiksstaden district. During the same years, de Thurah built Gammel Holtegård north of Copenhagen as a country house with a fine Baroque garden. He may have over-spent on his building projects. Thus, he never moved into No. 25 Amaliegade; instead, it was rented out upon completion.

=== No. 26–30 ===
Built 1896 to the design of architect Ole Boye, it is notable for its painted animal frieze depicting dragonflies, fish and frogs. In its centre stand two tigers head-to-head next to rows of penguins.

=== No. 33 ===
No. 33 is the Danish Shipowners' Association.

=== No. 49 ===
Built by carpenter and builder Andreas Hallander in 1788, it has seven bays separated by Ionic pilasters. Another typical Neoclassical decoration is a "running dog". The relief on the triangular pediment is an early work by Bertel Thorvaldsen depicting a female figure with a monocular next to a putto decorated with a garland.

== Cultural references ==
Egon (Ove Sprogøe) chairs a board meeting at Amaliegade 39 at 1:38:36 in the 1975 Olsen-banden film The Olsen Gang on the Track.

== See also ==
- Casino Theatre (Copenhagen)
