= Accident Investigation Board Denmark =

Accident Investigation Board Denmark (AIB, Danish: Havarikommissionen for Civil Luftfart og Jernbane, HCLJ) is the aviation accidents and incidents and railway accident and incident investigation board of the Denmark government. The agency is headquartered in Ringsted.

Formerly the head office was in Roskilde. It moved to Ringsted. By 2019 the agency was trying to find a place in Ringsted to move its investigation facilities, which were at the time still not in Ringsted.

== See also ==
- Danish Maritime Accident Investigation Board
- Danish Maritime Authority (previously housed the accident investigation board for ships)
