= Jürgen Wilder =

German railway executive

Jürgen Wilder, also spelled Juergen Wilder, is a German business executive working in the railway industry. He was a top-positioned Siemens AG executive, served as CEO of Deutsche Bahn's rail freight division, and was on the executive board of Knorr-Bremse AG, where he was in charge of developing rail vehicle systems and digitalization.

== Early life and education ==
Wilder studied physics at the University of Göttingen and received his doctorate from the Max Planck Institute for Polymer Research in Mainz in 1999. After earning his PhD, he did research at Harvard University in the Department of Chemistry and Chemical Biology.

== Career ==
Wilder worked at Siemens in a variety of roles both in Germany and Sacramento. He served as a senior executive for the business unit dealing with high speed and regional trains.

In October 2015, Wilder was appointed chief executive officer of DB Schenker Rail AG (later renamed DB Cargo), taking charge of Deutsche Bahn's European rail freight operations. He held this role until 2017, when he stepped down as CEO of DB Cargo by mutual agreement with Deutsche Bahn.

In September 2018, Wilder joined the executive board of Knorr-Bremse AG, a German company that makes braking systems and rail subsystems. He was responsible for the Rail Vehicle Systems division. An interview published by Knorr-Bremse identified him as the member of the Executive Board responsible for digitalization.

== See also ==
- Deutsche Bahn
- DB Cargo
- Knorr-Bremse
