= Georg Knorr =

German engineer (1859–1911)

Theodor Georg Knorr
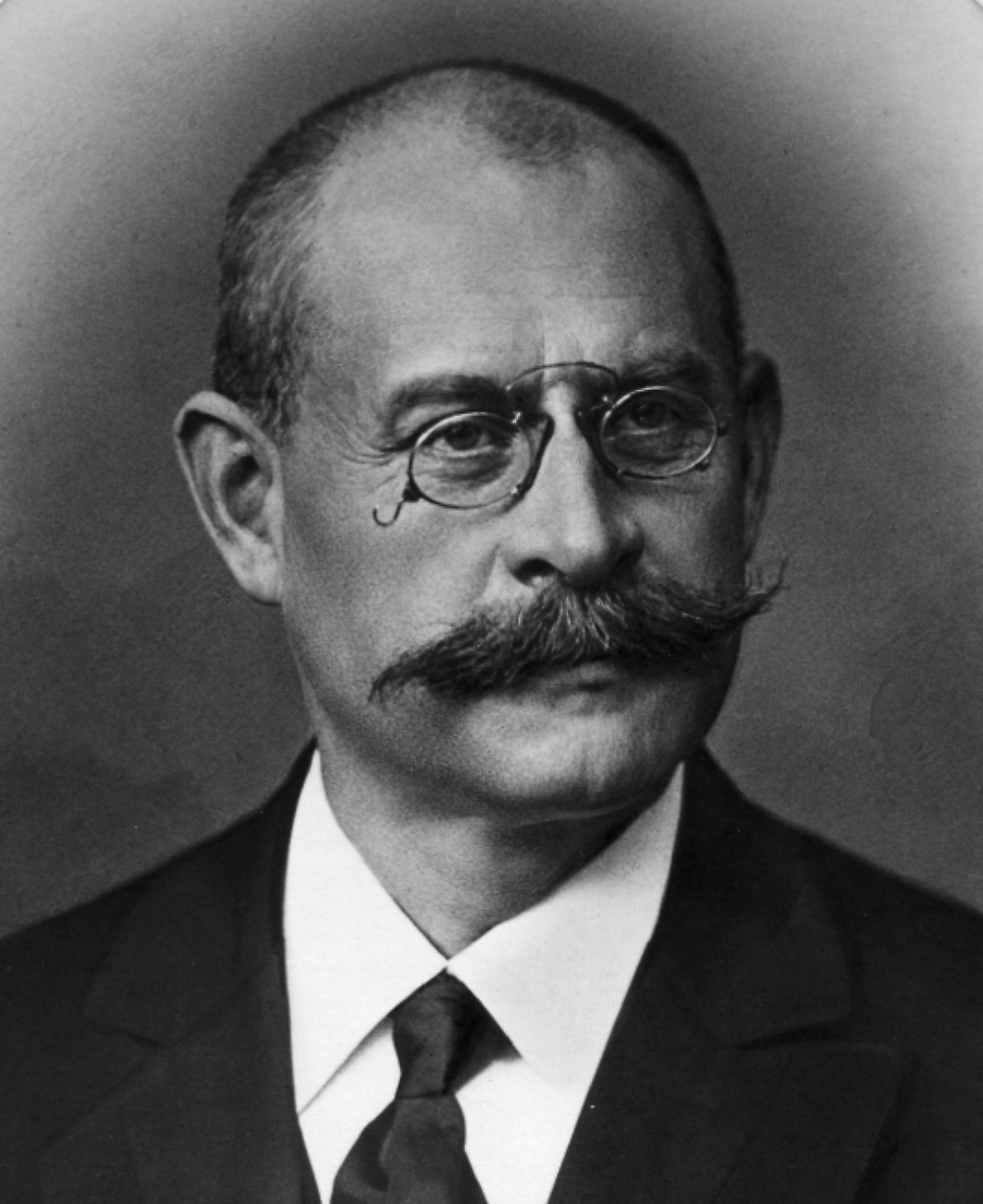
- Georg Knorr
- Born: 19 October 1859; Ruda bei Neumark, West Prussia, Kingdom of Prussia
- Died: 15 April 1911 (aged 51); Davos, Switzerland
- Occupation: Engineer
- Known for: Invention of railway air brakes

Theodor Georg Knorr (19 October 1859 – 15 April 1911) was a German engineer and entrepreneur on the field of railroad technology and founder of the company Knorr-Bremse. He is particularly remembered for his role in the development of the compressed air brake.

== Life and work ==
After studies in mechanical engineering, Georg Knorr worked at Krefeld's railroad administration. In 1884 he joined the Berlin branch of the American engineer Jesse Fairfield Carpenter's enterprise (at Schöneberger Ufer 17 in Berlin Zoologischer Garten), which promoted the introduction to the German market of the bicameral air brake produced by Carpenter. In 1893 Knorr took over the company "Carpenter & Schulze", transferred the production to Berlin-Britz and in 1900 he even developed a new brake, "Knorr's single chamber express brake". Now he concentrated on the production of his brake, the company's name however remained unchanged. From 1905 on, the "Knorr brake" entered the German railroad services for use at goods trains and soon became the standard brake for all European railroads; the "Carpenter brake" remained insignificant in Europe.

To start the mass production of his brake, Knorr moved the firm to a factory building at Neue Bahnhofsstraße 11/12 (which was later named Alte Fabrik) at Boxhagen-Rummelsburg in autumn 1904. In 1905 he eventually established the enterprise "Knorr-Bremse Gmbh" and also bought the neighbouring plot of land no. 13/14 so he could expand the production. There he built the so-called New Factory (Neue Fabrik). Because this plant as well could soon no longer satisfy the increasing demand, annexes were erected in the Hirschberger Straße beyond the train tracks.

Together with engineers Kunze and Hildebrand, Knorr pushed the development of railway air brake systems. They developed the Kunze-Knorr brake (a graduated-release composite brake, which can be tightened and released at will) and later the Hildebrand-Knorr brake (another graduated-release brake that simultaneously affects all cars of a train). The factory's profit was so great that in 1911 the enterprise was transformed into the "Knorr Brake Corporation" (Knorr-Bremse AG).

In 1910, Georg Knorr had to lay down the company's management for health reasons and eventually died during a cure in Davos in 1911. Because the family had its residence in Berlin's Lichtenberg district, Knorr was buried at the family's tomb at today's Robert-Siewert-Straße.

Only after Knorr's death, from 1913 to 1916, the facades of the factory buildings received their uniform design after plans by Alfred Grenander, by means of altering windows, applying brick dressings and by addition of arcades and sandstone reliefs to the parapets, pillars and dormers. On the yards, annexes (lateral and parallel wings) were added and an own heat plant was erected. To the main plant in the Hirschberger Straße a tunnel-like connection street was built. After the First World War and the Great Depression, the company was again able to operate profitably. In 1928 Knorr's heirs had another representative office building built, with tower-like dormers at three corners (whereby the western tower, directly facing the train line, is somewhat higher and has some quite large windows, while the others were devised without windows). All that was also undertaken after plans by Grenander and followed the previous line of design – the total area covered by buildings of Knorr-Bremse on both sides of the train tracks now measured 24,380 m².

Both Berlin locations of the former Knorr-Bremse AG are historically preserved. In one of the buildings, a "Knorr museum" was established.

== History of the company "Knorr-Bremse" ==
See Knorr-Bremse.

== Tribute to Georg Knorr ==
Numerous institutions and roads were named after Georg Knorr, e.g.:

- The sports club Georg Knorr in Berlin and Frankfurt, with judo, jiu jitsu, gymnastics, fitness competitions, etc. that participates in the first national league of Germany
- A business park in Berlin at the intersection of Landsberger Allee/Märkische Allee
- The ' 'Knorrpromenade' ' in Berlin-Friedrichshain, which was lined with buildings from 1911 on and received its name after the death of Georg Knorr
- Georg-Knorr-Straße in Berlin-Marzahn
- Georg-Knorr-Straße in Hohenbrunn in Munich
- Georg-Knorr-Straße in Kecskemét
