= DB Cargo =

International transport and logistics company

DB Cargo AG
- Trade name: DB Cargo
- Type: Privately held company
- Industry: Logistics
- Founded: 2009
- Headquarters: Mainz, Rhineland-Palatinate, Germany
- Key people: Bernard Osburg, CEO
- Products: Rail Transport; Maintenance
- Revenue: €4.5 billion
- Number of employees: 29,525 (2019)
- Parent: Deutsche Bahn
- Subsidiaries: 20 worldwide, including freight and contract logistics
- Website: www.dbcargo.com

DB Cargo (German pronunciation: [deːbeː ˈkaʁɡo]; previously known as Railion and DB Schenker Rail) is an international transport and logistics company. It is responsible for all of the rail freight transport activities of the German railway company Deutsche Bahn (the DB Group) both inside Germany and on a global level. DB Cargo has a registered office in Mainz and a further administrative office in Frankfurt am Main.

The company was founded as DB Cargo AG on 1 January 1999 under the second stage of liberalisation reform of the German railway system (Bahnreform) underway around this time. Initial operations were primarily focused on the rail freight market within Germany; however, during early 2000, the company was reorganised under the Railion holding company as part of a merger between DB Cargo and the Dutch state-owned rail company Nederlandse Spoorwegen's rail freight operations. This new structure was designed for the cooperation, and incorporation, of future partnerships with other rail freight companies; between 2004 and 2009, Railion expanded its operations into Italy, Switzerland, and Poland, typically via acquisitions. Following the acquisition of Schenker AG in the early 2000s, the company was restructured again and adopted the DB Schenker Rail branding. During 2016, to indicate its core focus on rail freight transportation, the company was once more rebranded as DB Cargo AG; this naming scheme has been progressively replicated across the majority of its international subsidiaries as well.

The services provided by DB Cargo include both block train and single wagonload transport services, the latter of which have been abandoned by many of the company's rivals. Based on the number of kilometres travelled, DB Cargo is the market leader in both Germany and Europe, although its transport services have been in decline for several years. Seeking to reverse this decline, a more flexible price structure was adopted alongside various cost-cutting measures in 2016. During the early 2020s, major global events such as the COVID-19 pandemic and the 2022 Russian invasion of Ukraine have challenged the company and driven changes. Within the context of the battle against climate change, however, the role of DB Cargo is also thought to be increasingly important, as the company offers transport options that are marketed as carbon neutral. However, a considerable share of the energy it uses still originates from non-renewable sources, and detractors denounce the company's claims about the environmental impact of their operations as greenwashing. The company has also been criticised for a lack of investment into both its rolling stock and infrastructure, and thus constraining its performance. In 2025, Bernard Osburg took on the role of CEO of DB Cargo.

== History ==
=== German rail reform ===
At the end of the 1990s, the operational business of Deutsche Bahn was reorganised into five legally independent joint-stock companies. This measure formed part of the second stage of the German rail reform. Within the scope of this restructuring, a precursor company was initially established in 1997, which had the purpose of facilitating a transformation of the entity's rail freight transport division structured under public law into a private enterprise company. Accordingly, on 1 January 1999, the company DB Cargo AG was ultimately founded to undertake these operations. The headquarters of DB Cargo AG were established in Mainz.

=== European expansion ===
At first, DB Cargo solely focused on its domestic activities. Accordingly, the Deutsche Bahn Group produced investment plans that directed billions in its subsidiary in order to improve its position in the German transport and logistics market. As the competitive environment with other European providers became increasingly challenging in the late 1990s, Deutsche Bahn (DB) and the Dutch state-owned rail company Nederlandse Spoorwegen (NS) announced plans to merge their rail freight transport activities in 1998.

Together, DB Cargo and NS Cargo reached revenues of around 6.9 billion Deutsche Mark (3.5 billion euros) and had roughly 50,000 employees. Their amalgamation was the first ever cross-border rail merger, in which Deutsche Bahn retained its majority share of 94%. A financial holding company, Railion GmbH, was created for this new company, and commenced operations during early 2000.

=== Internationalisation ===
The successful creation and launch of Railion laid the foundation for the establishment of a leading European transport and logistics company. Specifically, from the onset, the organisation was open to the incorporation of further partners. While the European Commission and European Parliament aimed to promote competition among providers, the providers themselves instead opted to foster cooperation. During 2001, the Danish state-owned rail company Danske Statsbaner (DSB) opted to merge its rail freight transport activities into the joint venture, becoming its third partner and received shares totalling 2% in Railion in return, thus decreasing the stake of Deutsche Bahn in the venture to 92%.

The cooperation between DB, NS and DSB has reportedly played an essential role in Deutsche Bahn's long-term strategy for expansion in other European countries. This strategy covered not only state-owned rail companies but also the acquisition of private sector rivals, for example in Italy (2004), Switzerland (2007) and Poland (2009). These were joined by a multitude of smaller acquisitions such as the transport and logistics divisions of RAG AG. In Sweden, where Deutsche Bahn was unable to acquire its chosen target, the company instead focused on establishing collaborative ventures. At the end of the 2000s, Railion was therefore able to not only offer connections across large stretches of Europe running from north to south, but reliably serve rail route that run from west to east as well.

Despite this expansion into the rail freight sectors of several neighbouring nations, the presence of effective competition to provide freight services had reportedly made a negative impact on the company's economic development by May 2005. Recognising the company's unfavourable financial position, Deutsche Bahn opted to respond by enacting numerous cost-saving measures; these were credited with a significant improvement in Railion's circumstances. During 2010, the rail freight transport crisis was initially deemed to have been largely resolved.

=== Linking rail and road ===
During early 2003, Deutsche Bahn transferred its share in Railion to the Stinnes AG (which later became DB Mobility Logistics). After the successful acquisition of the then-listed logistics company Stinnes, including its freight forwarding subsidiary Schenker AG, a restructuring of responsibilities took place within Deutsche Bahn. Subsequently, DB Cargo, NS Cargo and most of the other Railion companies solely focused on freight forwarding while Stinnes and Schenker took on central tasks in the fields of rail freight transport and sales. By consolidating all of its transport and logistics activities, Deutsche Bahn also aimed to achieve growth in the freight transport domain. The company adjusted its image to reflect this aim and as a result, DB Cargo was renamed Railion Deutschland.

At this point, the general objective pursued by Deutsche Bahn was to better cover the entire transport chain with all transportation means and routes. Over the years that followed, however, this approach mainly resulted in a shift of its freight transport activities away from the rails and towards the road network instead. The company realised that it needed to improve the links between its rail and road transport in particular, and securing acquisitions was one way to do so. In 2009, Deutsche Bahn abandoned the Railion brand and instead chose to consolidate all of its rail freight transport activities under the name DB Schenker Rail. At the time, its organisational structure remained unchanged. Media reports, however, already began to speculate about a stock market launch of the newly formed DB Schenker division.

=== Company restructuring ===
During the 2010s, the business operations of DB Schenker Rail experienced a significant decline. One of the primary factors behind this decline was the economic slump that had followed the 2008 financial crisis. The company initially responded to this negative development by introducing a more flexible price structure. It aimed to use a combination of block trains for large clients and bookings of single wagons to establish a fixed timetable that would in turn increase the capacity utilisation of its trains. Other measures considered included the closure of numerous freight railway stations in order to reduce fixed costs, and efforts to reduce staff headcount at all levels of the business.

News of these cost reduction measures was quickly met with sharp criticism by various trade unions; their opposition included demands that the approach be abandoned immediately, and accusations of the company's mismanagement. Following several months of negotiations, the Deutsche Bahn Group and its works council finally agreed on a restructuring programme for DB Cargo during February 2007. Under this programme, the previously proposed across-the-board job cuts that year were avoided, instead, the new approach aimed for the gradual reduction of headcount over a period of several years. On the whole, the company retained its ambition to grow its freight transport activities.

To reflect the company's focus on its core business activities in the domain of rail freight transport, it was again renamed, adopting the DB Cargo AG designation in early 2016. The name was also readopted for its most important German and international subsidiaries and continues to apply in the present day. Accordingly, DB Cargo and DB Schenker are equal sister companies within the integrated rail system of the DB Group.

=== Recent developments ===
According to media reports, DB Cargo reduced its fleet size by nearly one half in the 2000s and 2010s. The remaining locomotives were increasingly replaced by multi-system models that can also be used in the international rail network. Furthermore, the company also equipped its inventory of wagons with whisper brakes, which had reportedly halved the noise pollution generated by the movement of its freight trains. Another area of investment by the company has been the addition of state-of-the-art sensors and telematics, which has reportedly been responsible for improvements in its competitiveness. Seeking to progress developments in this area, between 2016 and 2019, DB Cargo played a leading role in the "Innovative Freight Wagons" research project conducted on behalf of the German Federal Ministry of Transport and Digital Infrastructure (BWVI). Although the wagons used by DB Cargo have generally become older in recent years, they have also increased in size so that they can transport larger quantities of goods.

As of 2020, the majority of freight is still being transported by road, DB Cargo stands to gain from the increased interest in its services due to the expectation that rail freight transport will play an essential role in achieving climate targets. Within this context and based on expert opinions, in September 2019, the German Federal Government announced plans to transfer millions of lorry trips from road to rail, although similar attempts made in previous years had reportedly achieved little progress. One of the main measures planned towards achieving this aim is the gradual optimisation of train drivers' productivity. The current changes being implemented at DB Cargo form part of the strategy to strengthen Deutsche Bahn in its entirety that was launched in 2019.

During the global outbreak of the novel respiratory disease COVID-19, which hindered cross-border logistics due to limitations in the area of passenger and goods transport, the company was able to secure its transport operations successfully. DB Cargo provided additional capacities for transporting supplies for the population, especially food and hygiene products. The running of large special freight services, such as the "Pasta Express" from Italy, attracted considerable media attention. Shortly after the start of the 2022 Russian invasion of Ukraine, DB Cargo started hauling aid from across Europe to Ukraine; however, military officials have issued warnings that DB Cargo lacks sufficient capacity to meet the needs of a large scale military conflict in Eastern Europe.

== Organisational structure ==
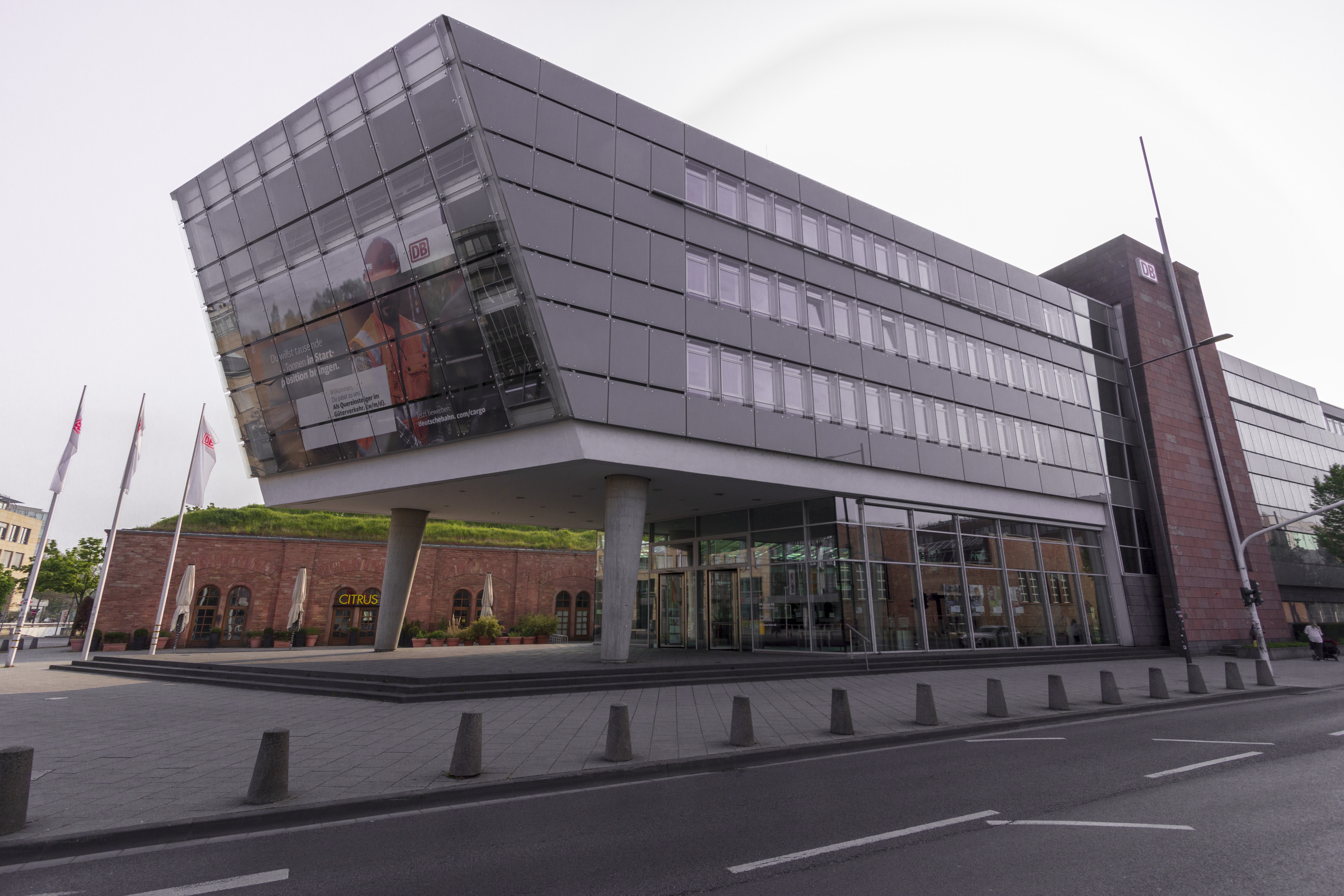
Headquarters of DB Cargo in Mainz

DB Cargo AG, a public limited company under German law, acts as a holding company for the operational entities. Its corporate purpose covers rail and road services for the transportation of all kinds of goods and the procurement and operation of stationary and mobile means of transport such as locomotives, railcars, wagons and other containers. Its articles of association also cover related services. The holding company is entitled to carry out all activities deemed to serve the specified business purpose either directly or indirectly. This includes the establishment and management of companies and the acquisition of other companies.

=== Owners ===
DB Cargo AG has a share capital of 256,007,000,000 euros, which is divided into 51,201,400 no-par value bearer shares. When it transferred the assets and liabilities of its former freight transport division as part of the spin-off for the establishment of a new company, Deutsche Bahn AG acquired all of the company's shares and is therefore the sole shareholder of DB Cargo AG. A control and profit-and-loss-transfer agreement is in place between the parent company and subsidiary. DB Cargo AG is included in the consolidated financial statement of Deutsche Bahn. The company Deutsche Bahn AG is in turn wholly owned by the Federal Republic of Germany.

=== Management ===
==== Management board ====
The Board of Management of DB Cargo AG is composed of at least two people, one of whom is responsible for staff-related and social matters in connection with employees. Otherwise, the Supervisory Board determines the number and identities of the members of the Board of Management. The current members of the DB Cargo AG Board of Management are Bernard Osburg (Chairman), Ralf Günter Kloss, Martina Niemann, Oliver Tietze, Pierre Timmermans and Tanja Fuchs. The percentage of women on the board exceeds the average value of other German companies.

==== Supervisory board ====
The supervisory board of DB Cargo AG has 20 members. It is composed of shareholder and employee representatives in equal measure, who are elected according to the regulations of the German Stock Corporation Act and German Codetermination Act. The supervisory board currently has six female and 14 male members. Its chairman is Werner Gatzer; the deputy chairman is Martin Burkert, a member of the board of the German Railway and Transport Union (EVG).

==== Former leadership ====
- Dr. Sigrid Nikutta (CEO 2019-2025)
- Dr. Roland Bosch (CEO 2017–2019)
- Dr. Jürgen Wilder (CEO 2015–2017)
- Alexander Hedderich (CEO 2009–2015)

=== Companies ===
The business operations of DB Cargo are divided into three regions: Germany, Central Europe and Western & Eastern Europe. The German company DB Cargo AG is responsible for both operational services in the field of rail freight transport in Germany and central functions such as production, sales, finance and human resources for the entire DB Cargo Group.

During 2010, Deutsche Bahn joined several other railway companies in becoming a partner of the European Xrail Alliance, represented by its subsidiary DB Schenker Rail (now DB Cargo). Ever since it was established, the alliance has focused on the objective of making single wagonload transport, namely freight trains with wagons used by different clients, a more competitive alternative to lorry transport. Xrail also aims to achieve more customer-friendly service, efficiency and punctuality in cross-border transport, for example with its universal booking system, Xrail Capacity Booking (XCB).

==== Rail freight transport ====
Within the Deutsche Bahn Group, DB Cargo is mainly responsible for the following subsidiary and sister companies, all of which are directly involved in the domain of rail freight transport:

- DB Cargo Belgium, Antwerp, Belgium
- DB Cargo Bulgaria, Pirdop, Bulgaria
- DB Cargo Czechia, Ostrava, Czech Republic
- DB Cargo Danmark, Taastrup, Denmark (formerly DSB Cargo)
- DB Cargo Eurasia GmbH, Berlin, Germany (formerly Trans-Eurasia Logistics)
- DB Cargo France, Paris, France (formerly Euro Cargo Rail)
- DB Cargo Hungária, Győr, Hungary
- DB Cargo Italia, Novate Milanese, Italy (formerly SFM Strade Ferrate del Mediterraneo)
- DB Cargo Nederland, Utrecht, Netherlands (formerly NS Cargo)
- DB Cargo Polska, Zabrze, Poland (formerly PCC Rail)
- DB Cargo Romania, Timișoara, Romania
- DB Cargo Russija, Moscow, Russia
- DB Cargo Schweiz, Basel, Switzerland (formerly BRS Brunner Railway Services)
- DB Cargo UK, Doncaster, United Kingdom
- Transfesa (Transportes Ferroviarios Especiales), Madrid, Spain

==== Service companies ====
These are joined by further companies that have special responsibilities in areas such as sales, transporting dangerous goods and combining traffic flows:

- DB Cargo BTT
- DB Cargo Logistics
- DB Intermodal Services
- TFG Transfracht
- Transa Spedition

== Services ==
=== Service catalogue ===
The service catalogue of DB Cargo consists of a wide variety of basic, additional and special services. The company's core products particularly include block train and single wagonload transport services, the combination of rail and road, and carbon-neutral transport, for example for Audi. The latter is becoming increasingly important given that rail transport currently has the lowest carbon emissions of all carriers and also achieved the largest savings in recent years (1995–2015).

The company additionally offers a wide range of industry solutions, for example for the chemicals industry and the timber and building materials trades. DB Cargo is also active on an international level. Its global operations particularly focus on transport between Europe and Asia, where the company has an extensive network. Its service portfolio also includes related services such as the sale and rental of locomotives and wagons.

=== Key figures ===
In the 2018 business year, DB Cargo transported more than 255 million tonnes of goods in 2,686 traction units and 82,895 goods wagons. Leased or hired materials are factored into these totals. The company provided its services on around 4,200 sidings belonging to clients in Germany, Denmark, Italy, the Netherlands and Switzerland. It transported goods along a route network covering a total of 33,000 kilometres in Germany and, according to calculations by the German Federal Office for Goods Transport (BAG), achieved an average punctuality rate of 72.9% when providing these services.

== Criticism ==
During 2019, DB Cargo was reportedly operating at a loss. Critics have accused Deutsche Bahn of having neglected the necessary maintenance work on, and the modernisation of, DB Cargo's infrastructure; claims have also been made that the comparably high average age of its locomotives and wagons is a prime example of this problem. In September 2019, the German Federal Ministry of Transport and Digital Infrastructure (BMVI) responded to criticism by the German Federal Court of Auditors regarding the company's lack of investments by arguing that DB Cargo and other segments had yet to exhaust their full potential.

During mid 2022, the European Commission (EC) conducted an investigation into the allegedly unfair provision of state aid to DB Cargo from the German government. Limited amounts of state aid, such as to offset the abnormal economic conditions caused by the COVID-19 pandemic, have been approved by the EC in the past.

Single wagonload transport have played a special role in the economic development of DB Cargo and the wider rail freight sector alike. In the late 2010s, experts were issuing demands that the company subsidise its activities, or shrink its business, in this area in order to remain a strong competitive alternative to lorry transport.

Following the Great Belt Bridge rail accident, in which eight people died, a union representative from DB Cargo was convicted of evidence tampering.

== See also ==
- Transportation in Germany
- Transportation in the Netherlands
