= Italian ambassador's residence in Copenhagen =

Building in Copenhagen, Denmark

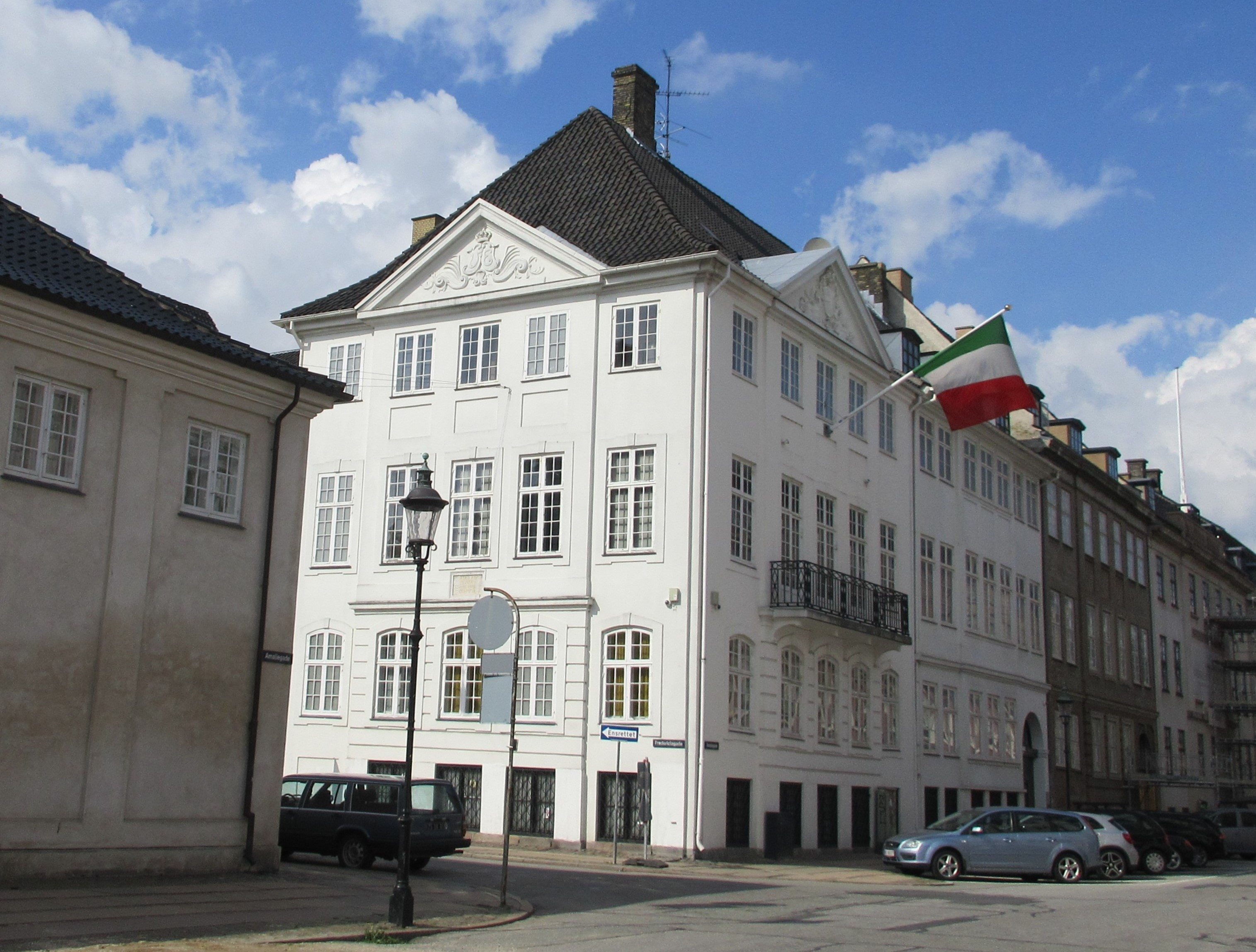
The building viewed from Amaliegade

The Italian ambassador's residence in Copenhagen (Danish: italienske Ambassadørbolig i København or Residensen; Italian: Residenza dell'ambasciatore d'Italia a Copenaghen) stands at the corner of Amaliegade with Fredericiagade in the Frederiksstaden neighbourhood of Copenhagen, Denmark.

== History ==
The original house was built by Johan Christian Conradi for custom inspector Jacob Rahbek in the 1750s. The writer Knud Lyhne Rahbek, Jacob Rahbek's son and a central figure in the Danish Golden Age, grew up in the building.

Jacob Rahbek sold the property to a merchant named Duncan in about 1670 and built a new house at Store Kongensgade 59 in 1782. Duncan expanded the house with two new wings to the rear in 1783. Custom officer Hans Boye purchased the house in 1795. His wife was the writer Birgitte Cathrine Boye.

Baron Carl Frederik Gyllembourg-Ehrensvärd (1767–1815) rented the first floor appartement and lived here 1806-1813 with his wife Thomasine Christine Gyllembourg-Ehrensvärd who later became a writer. The violinist and composer Claus Schall lived at Fredericiagade 2 from 1825 until 1835. Later residents at Fredericiagade include philosophy professor F. C. Sibbern (1785–1872). Later Defence Minister P. F. Steinmann lived in the building from 1837 to 1839 and again in 1841. The actor Peter Schram (1819–1895) lived in te building from 1842 to 1845. The painter and illustrator Lorenz Frølich lived in the building from 1875 until 1878 after his return to Denmark after many years abroad.

In 1908, Isak Glückstadt acquired the building. He was managing director of Den Danske Landmandsbank (now Danske Bank). In 1909, he renovated the oldest part of the house. The dining room on the second floor and the balcony overlooking Amaliegade date from this renovation. The first expansion of the house from the second half of the 18th century was replaced by a new wing on Amaliegade in the 1910s. The new wing contained a large ball room.

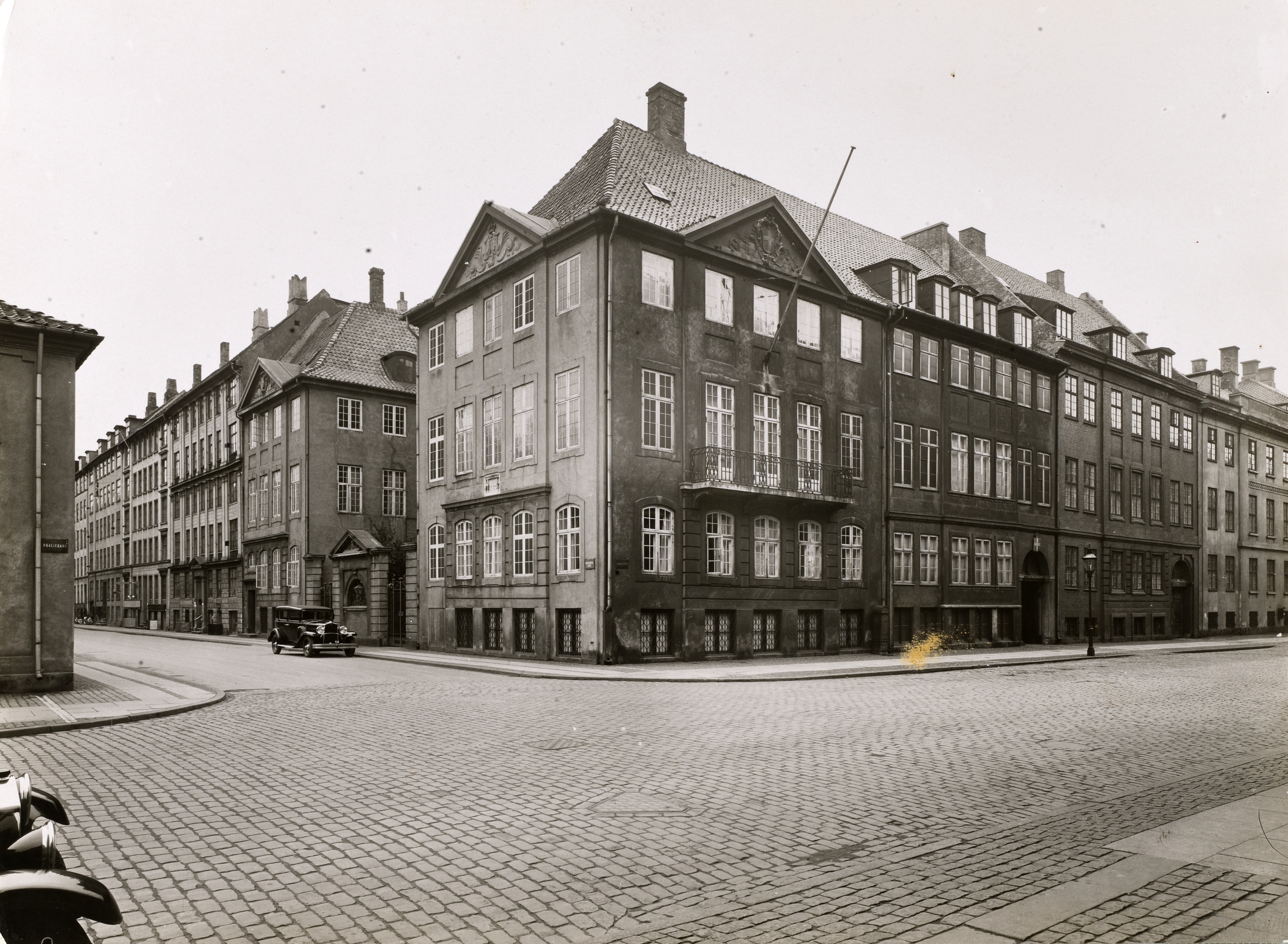
The building in 1935.

The Italian state purchased the building in 1924. It fell into disrepair during World War II and the years that followed. Restoration began in 1981.

== Interior ==
The Italian state almost completely changed the interiors after acquiring the building in 1924. The only surviving features of note are two frescos painted on canvas. One is by Magnus Berg (1666–1739) and the other, Galatheas triumf, is by Henrik Krock (1671–1738). The building now also contains paintings by Giuseppe Recco and One of the dining rooms features two flower paintings by G. Lopez (Gaspare dei Fiori) which came from the art museum in Naples.
