= BarentsWatch =

Coordinates: 69.64366°N 18.94858°E

Barentswatch
- Company type: Government agency
- Industry: Ocean Monitoring
- Founded: 2010
- Headquarters: Tromsø, Norway
- Area served: Barents Sea Norway
- Key people: Geir Schulstad
- Parent: Norwegian Coastal Administration
- Website: www.barentswatch.no

BarentsWatch was launched in May-2012 by Norwegian Minister of Foreign Affairs Jonas Gahr Støre and Norwegian Minister of Fisheries and Coastal Affairs Lisbeth Berg-Hansen. The information portal provides an overview of activity and knowledge in coastal and sea areas. The system covers sea and coastal areas from Denmark in the south, to Greenland in the west, the North Pole in the north and Novaja Semlja in the east.

The establishment of the BarentsWatch information system is based on cooperation between 27 Norwegian state agencies and research institutes. The Norwegian government decided in June 2010 that their ocean management and information system BarentsWatch should be placed in Tromsø. The system integration was delivered by Kongsberg Spacetec.

== Partners ==
- Bioforsk
- Center for International Climate and Environmental Research-Oslo (CICERO)
- Norwegian Meteorological Institute
- Norut
- Norwegian Armed Forces
- Norwegian Defence Research Establishment
- Norwegian Polar Institute
- Norwegian Directorate for Nature Management
- Norwegian Mapping and Cadastre Authority
- Norwegian Climate and Pollution Agency
- Norwegian Institute of Marine Research
- Norwegian Institute for Air Research
- Norwegian Customs
- University of Tromsø
- Norwegian Space Centre
- National Police Directorate (Norway)
- Directorate for Civil Protection and Emergency Planning
- Joint Rescue Coordination Centre of Southern Norway
- University Centre in Svalbard
