= Knorr-Bremse =

German braking system manufacturer

Knorr-Bremse AG
- Type: Public
- Traded as: FWB: KBX; MDAX Component
- Industry: Manufacturing
- Predecessor: Süddeutsche Bremsen-AG
- Founded: 1905; 121 years ago, in Berlin, Germany
- Headquarters: Munich, Germany,
- Key people: Marc Llistosella (CEO); Dr. Reinhard Ploss (chairman of the Supervisory Board)
- Products: braking systems (rail and road)
- Revenue: 7,925,610,000 euro (2023)
- Operating income: 869,870,000 euro (2023)
- Net income: 552,530,000 euro (2023)
- Total assets: 8,248,560,000 euro (2023)
- Number of employees: 33,319 (2023)
- Website: www.knorr-bremse.com

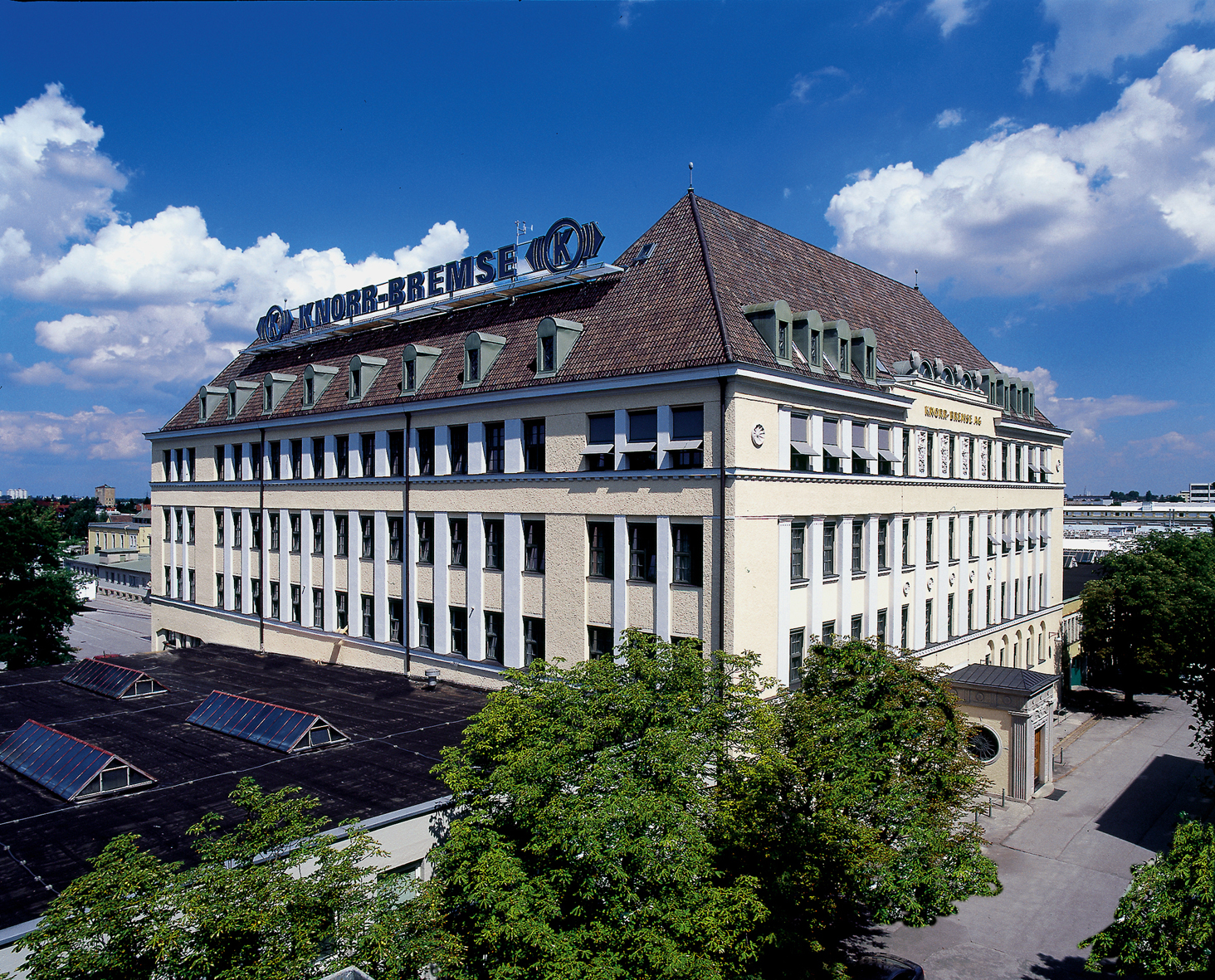
Knorr-Bremse AG headquarters today, Munich

Knorr-Bremse AG is a German manufacturer of braking systems for rail and commercial vehicles that has operated since 1905. Other products in the company's portfolio include intelligent door systems, control components, air conditioning systems for rail vehicles, torsional vibration dampers, and transmission control systems for commercial vehicles.

The Group has a presence in over 30 countries, at 100 locations. In 2022, the Group's workforce of over 31,000 achieved worldwide sales of EUR 7.15 billion.

== History ==
=== Foundation and early years ===
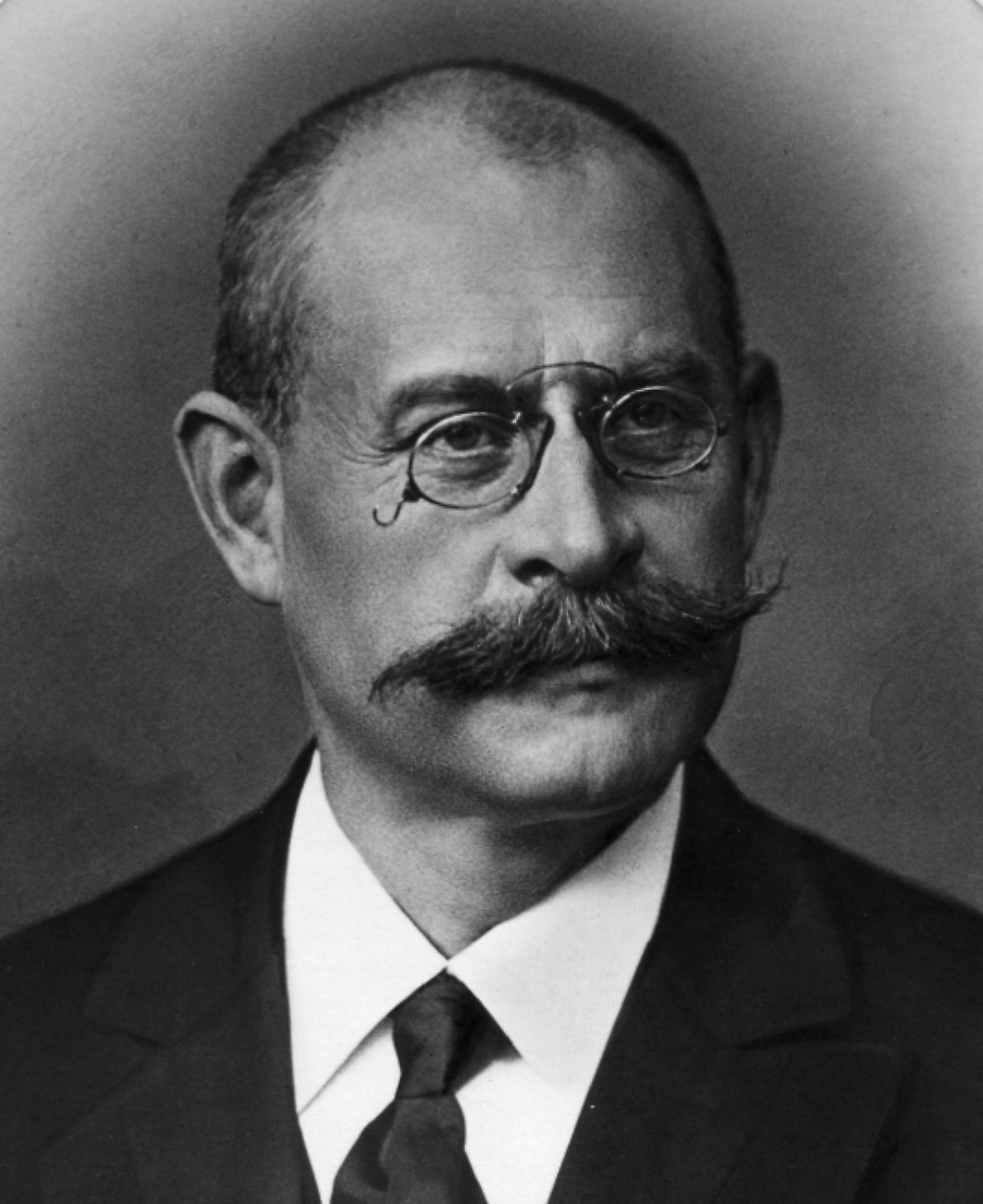
Georg Knorr (1859–1911)

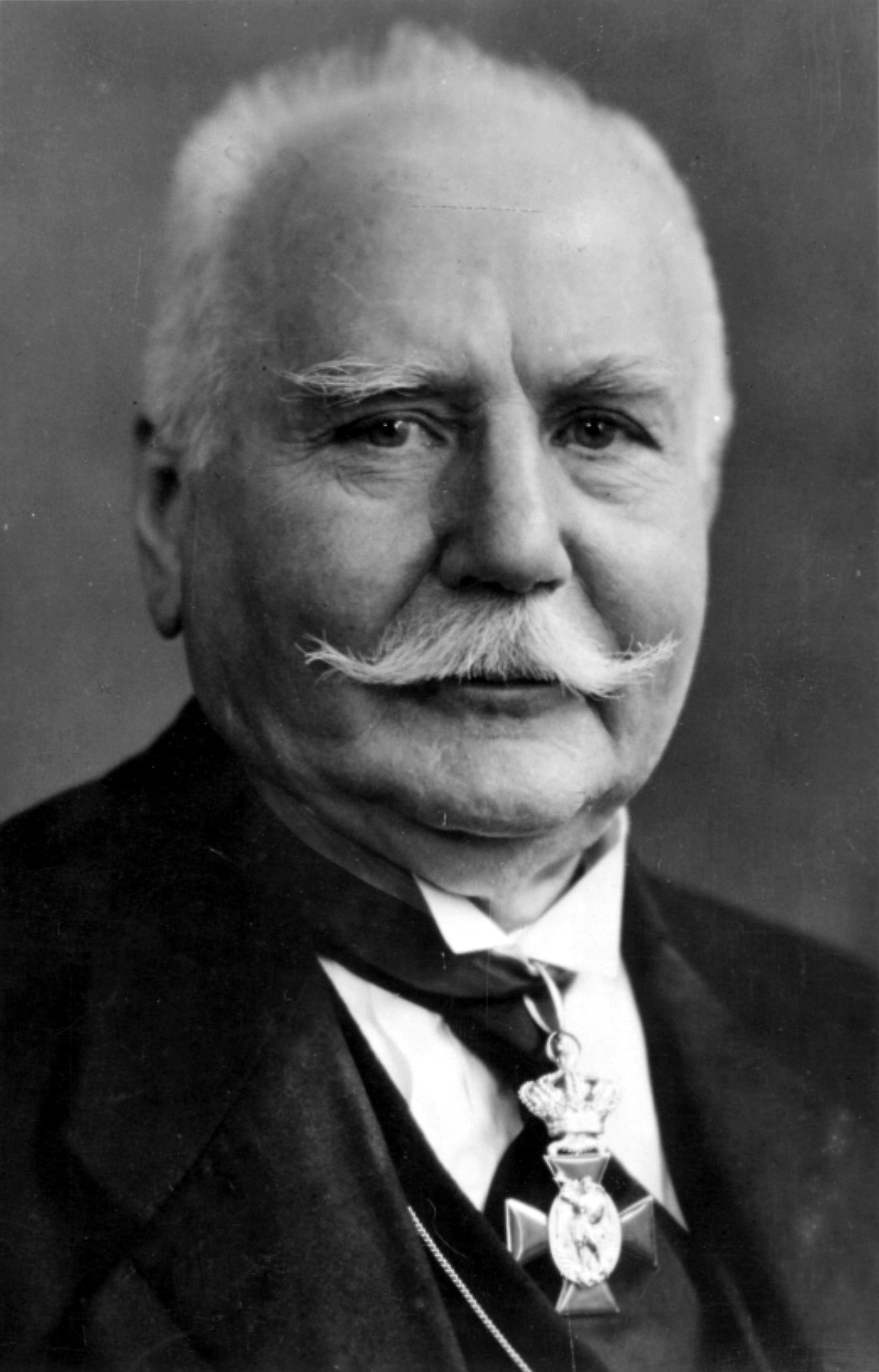
Bruno Kunze (1854–1935)

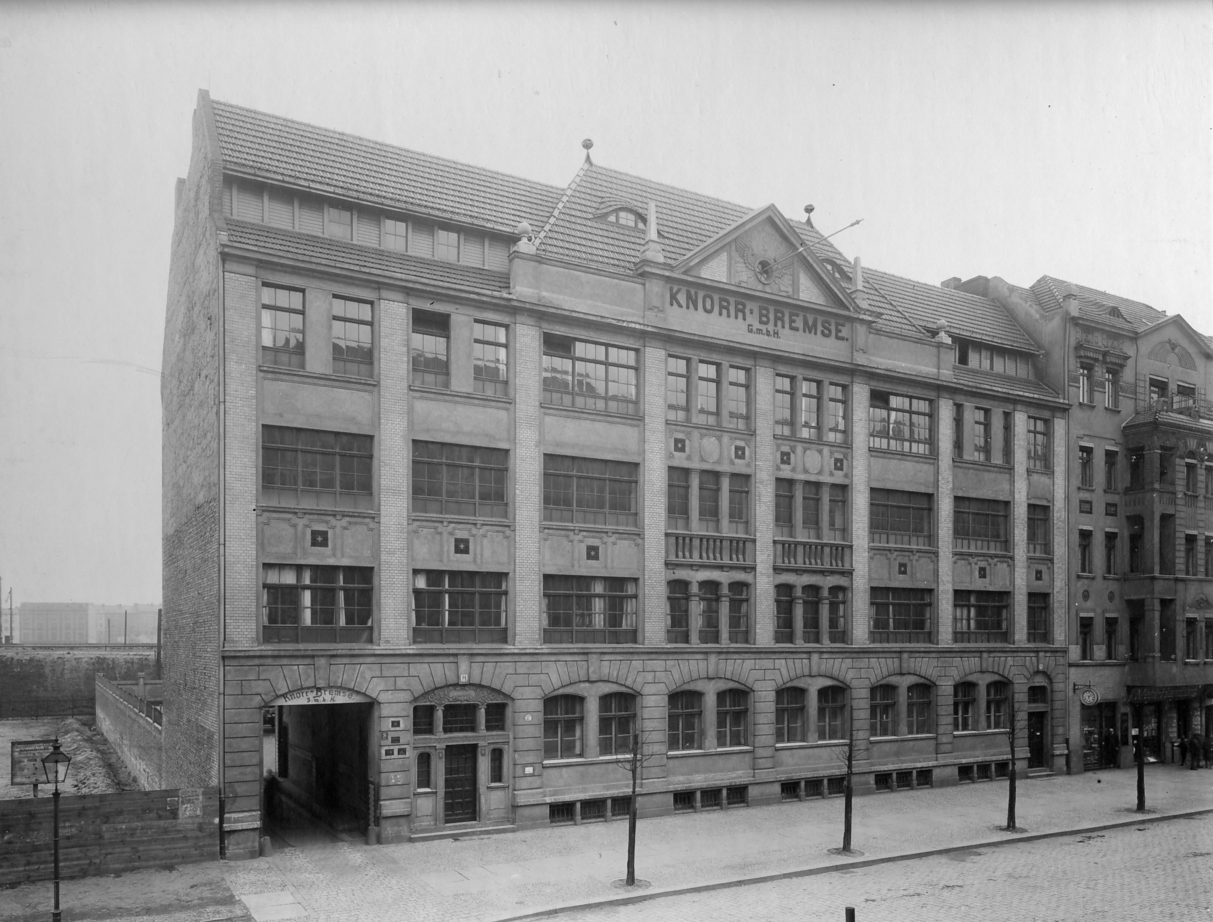
Knorr-Bremse GmbH, Berlin (1908)

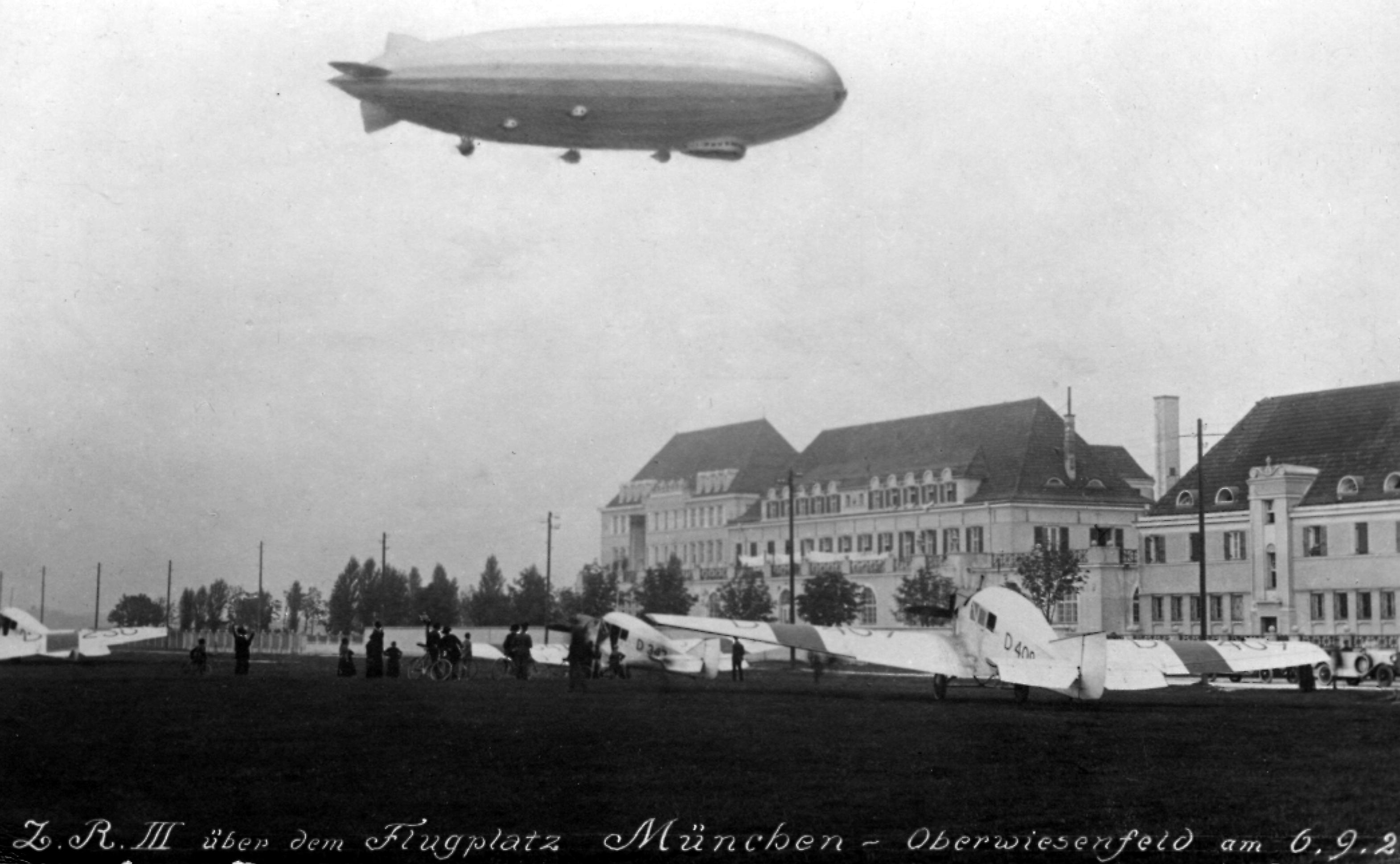
Süddeutsche Bremsen-AG, Munich (1924) with the USS Los Angeles (ZR-3) shortly after its maiden flight

The German engineer Georg Knorr established Knorr-Bremse GmbH in 1905 in Boxhagen-Rummelsburg, Neue Bahnhofstraße, outside Berlin (since 1920 part of Berlin-Friedrichshain). From the onset, the company benefitted heavily from Knorr's prior experience working on railway braking systems at, Carpenter & Schulze, a separate company that he owned. Knorr promptly put into production an innovative rapid release brake that could bring passenger trains to a halt faster, more safely and consistently.

In 1911, the company merged with "Continentale Bremsen-GmbH" to found Knorr-Bremse Aktiengesellschaft (AG). From 1913 onwards, a second manufacturing plant, new headquarters, a heating plant and other annex buildings were erected. During 1918, the company introduced the Kunze-Knorr freight train brake; for a time, Knorr-Bremse was the only supplier of these new brakes, not just in Germany and other European countries; the innovation was soon credited with a reduction in the rate of major accidents upon the railway.

An early cornerstone of Knorr's commercial success was provided by an agreement with the Prussian State Railways, which at that time had formed the Prussian-Hessian Railway Company, to supply single-chamber express braking systems, first for passenger and later on for freight trains. The introduction of the "Knorr Druckluft-Einkammerschnellbremse" (K1) compressed-air brake, along with its derivatives, offered considerably enhanced safety performance compared with traditional systems. In the early twentieth century, train guards still had to operate brakes by hand, from so-called "brake vans". The first pneumatic brakes were of a basic design, but before long, indirect automatic systems using control valves were developed. See History of rail transport in Germany for an overview.

=== Interwar period ===
In 1920, the manufacturing plant of the first Bayerische Motoren-Werke AG (BMW, established in 1917/1918) located in Munich, Moosacher Straße, became a subsidiary of Knorr-Bremse, delivering brake systems as Süddeutsche Bremsen-AG for the Bavarian Group Administration, the former "Royal Bavarian State Railways". There was no further interest in motor engines for aircraft and automobiles. The engine construction and the company name "BMW" were sold in 1922 to financier Camillo Castiglioni to be combined with the Bayerische Flugzeugwerke AG (BFW, located not far away), establishing the company a second time. For details see History of BMW and BFW/Messerschmitt.

Between 1922 and 1927, the company's new main manufacturing plant in Berlin at the Hirschberger Straße/Schreiberhauer Straße next to the Berlin Ringbahn was erected, a tunnelled road permitted direct access between the old and the new sites.

A second major sector of activity emerged during 1922 when Knorr-Bremse secured a patent for the use of pneumatic braking systems for commercial road vehicles. One year later, the company became the first in Europe to develop a system that applied the brakes simultaneously to all four wheels of a truck as well as its trailer; the resultant reduction in braking distances made a significant contribution to improving road safety. By the end of the 1930s, around 90 percent of all trucks in Germany between 7 and 16 tonnes in weight had been equipped with Knorr-Bremse systems.

During 1931, the company launched a new standard brake for trains, the Hildebrand-Knorr brake (HiK brake). Over the follow three years, improved models suited for a wider range of trains, including express trains, became available as well. Due to its effectiveness, the HiK brake was adopted by 17 countries; by 1955, there were roughly 280,000 units in operation worldwide.

The Second World War impacted the company greatly. During the conflict, Knorr-Bremse had manufactured the Swedish light MG35/36 machine guns AKA "Knorr-Bremse machine guns" on behalf of the Wehrmacht. At the conclusion of the war, Germany was split into West and East Germany; the company's facilities in the eastern part of Berlin were quickly expropriated and dismantled by the Soviets as a part of war reparations.

During the Second World War Knorr-Bremse used forced foreign works living in a one of around more than thousand labor camps spread around Berlin. All in all more than four hundred thousand foreign workers lived in the labor camps. And one of these camps belonged to Knorr-Bremse.

=== Cold War era ===
Little remained of the company's operations save for numerous blueprints that several employees had managed to retrieve. During 1946, Knorr-Bremse was re-established in Volmarstein, West Germany, and efforts commenced to rebuild the company proper. Three years later, its reconstruction was aided by the United States' Marshall Plan, which financed the Deutsche Bundesbahn's building of 18,000 new freight cars equipped with Knorr-Bremse brake units.

During 1953, its new headquarters were completed at the Süddeutsche Bremsen-AG plant in Munich. That same year, the company introduced two key products, the automatic load-dependent braking system, that was designed to be effectively used on the increasing size, weight, and speed of trucks, and the Knorr Standard Brake (KE brake) train brake with graduated release control valve. The latter received International Union of Railways (UIC) approval and led to sales across 40 different countries, totaling almost 1.3 million units.

During the 1960s, Knorr-Bremse started offering a newly-developed air compressor program to customers; it also made greater use of compressed air to perform various functions, including air suspension, level regulation, pneumatic gearshifts, and door actuation. In 1969, it presented its first disc brake for heavy trucks at the IAA trade fair in Frankfurt; it comprised a hydraulically-operated hinged caliper brake. By this point, the company was already undertaking research into advanced control systems, which included microelectronics and digital techniques, seeking to develop commercially viable innovations for sale. In 1973, Knorr-Bremse established the Knorr Brake Corporation with the purpose of developing a presence in the lucrative North American market.

During 1981, the company undertook the first installation of an anti-lock braking system (ABS) as standard equipment upon trucks being produced by MAN Truck & Bus, which had partnered with Knorr-Bremse on the development of ABS. Four years later, the company secured approval from the Association of American Railroads (AAR) for its recently developed DB 60 direct-release control valve for freight trains; via its US subsidiary, the DB 60 entered use in North America in 1985, where it was commonly used on exceptionally long freight trains hauled by multiple locomotives.

In 1985, Knorr-Bremse GmbH merged with Süddeutsche Bremsen AG to form Knorr-Bremse AG, after which numerous structural changes were made and the business was reoriented around its core activities. By 1988, the Thiele family had acquired 100 percent of the shares in Knorr-Bremse AG.

During 1987, the company revealed its prototype pneumatic disc brake; it would be a sales success, with 20 million Knorr-Bremse disc brakes being in operation across the world by 2024. In 1989, Knorr-Bremse also released its electronic braking system (EBS), which integrated brake control, ABS and traction control into a single electronic-based system, possessing shorter response times and reduced braking distances compared to traditional pneumatic control, and thus greater safety. During the early 1990s, Knorr-Bremse's electro-pneumatic independent brake units were installed into the ICE 1 high speed trainsets operated by DB Fernverkehr.

Between 1993 and 1994, the company was reorganised; the rail and commercial vehicles were separated into independent companies; thereafter, management pursued a strategy orientated around international expansion. In 1999, a joint venture was created between Knorr-Bremse and Bosch. Three years later, the company acquired the American brake manufacturer Bendix Corporation.

=== Recent history ===
During late 2016, Vossloh Electrical Systems was acquired by the company.

Knorr-Bremse long held a stake in one of its main European competitors, Haldex. During the mid 2010s, various parties submitted bids to fully acquire Haldex, including Knorr-Bremse; the company's bid was observed by Haldex's board of directors as having been the most generous, but also to have "done nothing to eliminate or reduce the regulatory risk". By December 2016, it had purchased 86.1 percent of Haldex's shares to strengthen its takeover bid. During mid 2017, the European Commission launched an anti-trust probe into the acquisition. Knorr-Bremse ultimately chose to discountinue its bid, selling on all of its shares in Haldex by June 2022.

From 2018 to 2023, Jürgen Wilder served on the Executive Board of Knorr-Bremse AG with responsibility for its Rail Vehicle Systems division.

On 13 October 2022, it was announced that Knorr-Bremse AG had chosen Marc Llistosella to be a member of the Executive Board and CEO. The appointment takes effect as of 1 January 2023.

In September 2024, the company acquired Alstom's American rail signalling business for $690 million, which created KB Signaling.

In January 2026, it was announced that Knorr-Bremse had completed the acquisition of Duagon AG, a Switzerland-based supplier of embedded electronics, hardware and software for railway applications, from Deutsche Beteiligungs following regulatory approval. The transaction, first announced in September 2025, was reported to have a purchase price of approximately €500 million, excluding a potential performance-related earn-out.

== Products ==
=== Rail vehicles ===
Knorr-Bremse not only produces complete braking systems for all types of rolling stock but also door systems, toilets, air conditioning, couplings and windscreen wipers. In 2000, it purchased British manufacturer, Westinghouse Brakes (formerly the brakes division of Westinghouse Brake and Signal Company Ltd), from Invensys, and subsequently moved its operations from Chippenham to the nearby English town of Melksham, Wiltshire.

Since 2002, Knorr-Bremse has been working on variable gauge systems for more efficient solutions to break of gauge problems.

=== Commercial vehicles ===
Knorr-Bremse has been developing and manufacturing braking systems for commercial vehicles since 1920, for trucks and semi-trailer tractor units over 6 tonnes, buses, trailers or special vehicles.

=== Control systems ===
The product portfolio of Knorr-Bremse includes Rail vehicle control systems, Air supply, and control systems, HVAC systems, Driver assistance systems, Digital solutions for rail vehicles, Wheel-slip prevention systems, Vehicle safety systems, and On-board energy storage systems.

== See also ==
- New York Air Brake
- Robert Bosch GmbH
- Westinghouse Air Brake Company
