= Danish Maritime Accident Investigation Board =

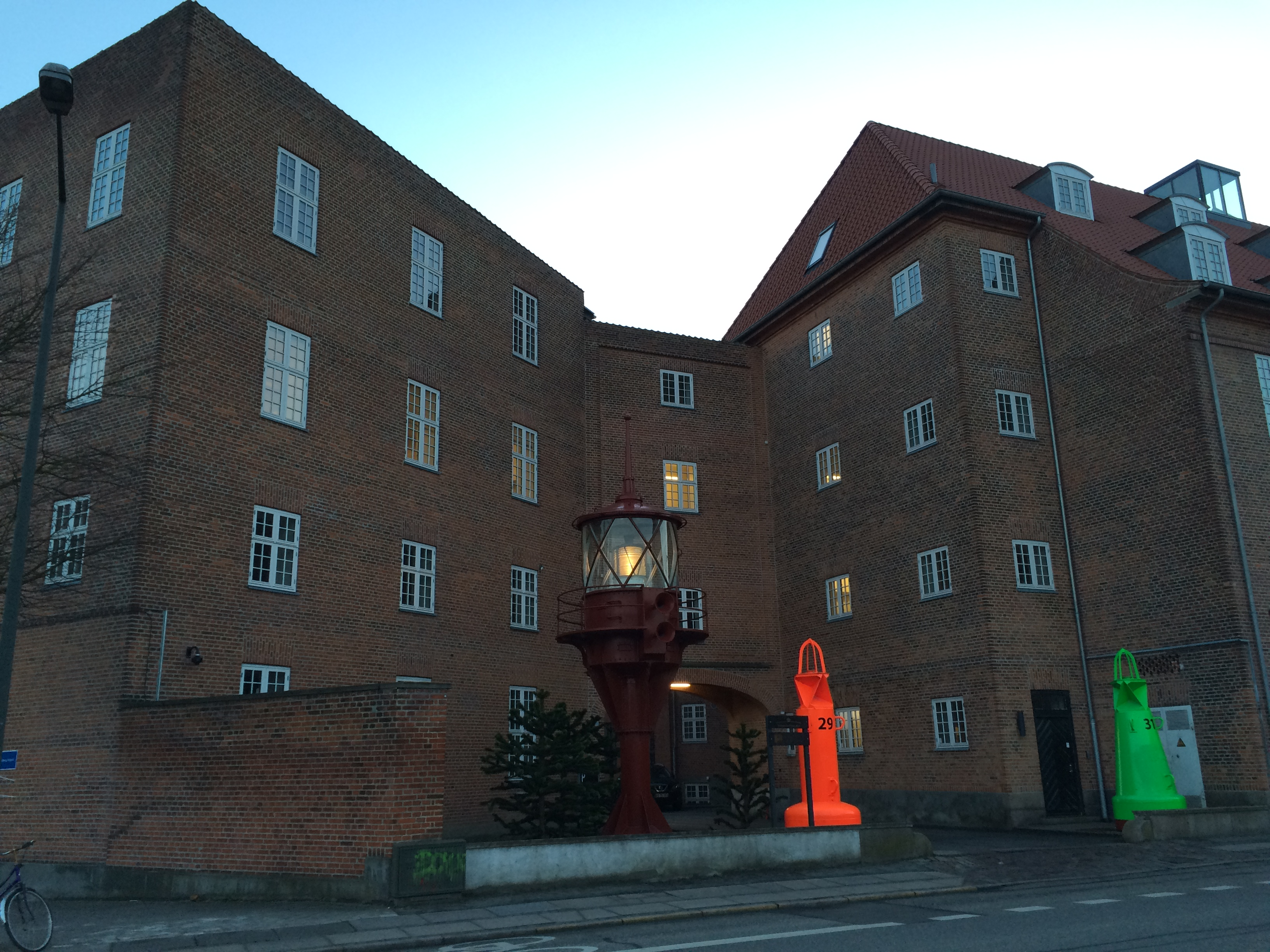
Head office

The Danish Maritime Accident Investigation Board (DMAIB, Danish: Den Maritime Havarikommission) is the maritime accident investigation agency of Denmark, headquartered in Valby, Copenhagen. It is an agency of the Ministry of Business and Growth Denmark.

== History ==
Previously the Danish Maritime Authority's Division for Investigation of Maritime Accidents investigated maritime accidents. A European Union directive asks countries to establish maritime investigation authorities that are independent of the maritime administration divisions. The bill L xx will cause Denmark to establish a new maritime investigation agency.
