= Global Maritime Forum =

International nonprofit foundation

- Formation: January 2014; 12 years ago
- Type: International non-for-profit organization
- Purpose: Shaping the future of global seaborne trade to increase sustainable long-term economic development and human wellbeing.
- Headquarters: Copenhagen, Denmark
- Region served: Worldwide
- Official language: English
- Website: www.globalmaritimeforum.org

The Global Maritime Forum is an international not-for-profit organisation for the global maritime industry. It convenes leaders from across the maritime community with policy-makers, experts, NGOs and other influential decision-makers.

== Initiatives ==
The Getting to Zero Coalition is a partnership between the Global Maritime Forum and the World Economic Forum. Launched at the United Nations Climate Change Conference in New York in 2019, the Getting to Zero Coalition is a platform that convenes around 200 stakeholders from across the shipping and fuels value chain. The goal of the Getting to Zero Coalition is to have commercially viable Zero Emission Vessels operating along deep sea trade routes by 2030, supported by the necessary infrastructure for scalable zero-carbon energy sources including production, distribution, storage and bunkering. The ultimate ambition of the Getting to Zero Coalition is to reach the full decarbonization of global shipping by 2050; in 2021, Call to Action initiative was developed with more than 150 industry leaders and organizations urging governments and global shipping industry to commit to full decarbonization of international shipping by 2050.

== Founding partners ==
The 14 founding partners of the Global Maritime Forum are A.P. Møller-Mærsk, Arshiya Limited, Euronav, GasLog, Gorrissen Federspiel, Gulf Agency Company, Heidrick & Struggles, Hempel Group, KfW IPEX-Bank MISC, Onassis Foundation, PSA International, Trafigura and Wan Hai Lines.

== Secretariat ==
The organization is based in Copenhagen.

== Summits ==
The first summit of the Global Maritime Forum took place in Hong Kong, October 2018.
