= Northern Research Institute =

Norwegian research institute

Coordinates: 68°26′47″N 17°27′15″E

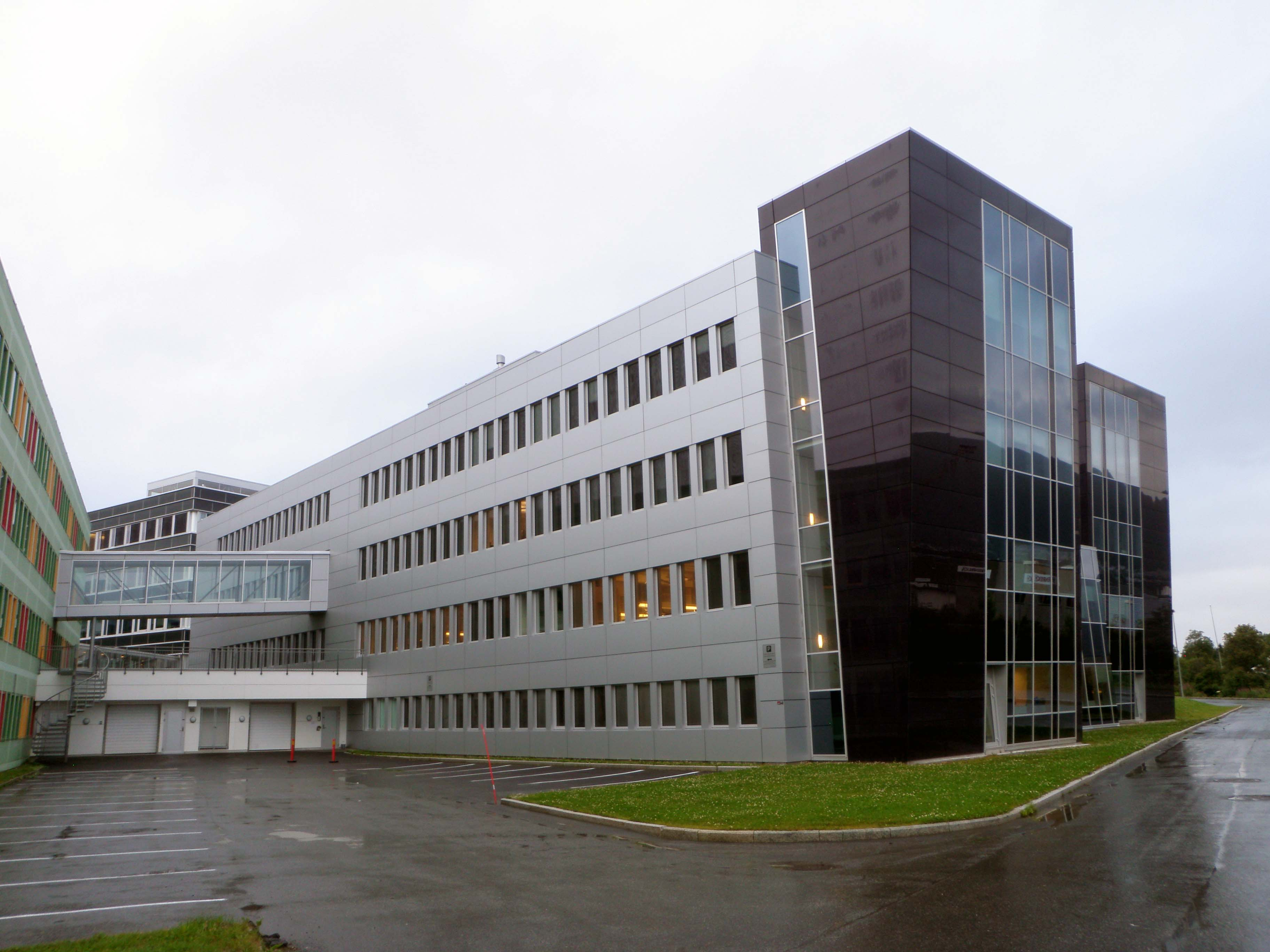
Northern Research Institute building in Tromsø

Norut Northern Research Institute is a research and innovation company in Norway that produces knowledge with practical applicability relevant to the High North within technology and social science.

Norut consists of the following companies:

- Norut
- Norut Narvik
- Norinnova Technology Transfer
- Barents Biocentre Lab
