= Research and Development Network in Norway =

The Research and Development Network in Norway (Norwegian: Forsknings og utviklingsnett i Norge) or FUNN was fourteen computing centers established in regional districts in Norway established by Norsk Data (ND) and the Ministry of Trade and Industry in 1989. These were located in Ålesund, Alta, Bø, Gjøvik, Grimstad, Kirkenes, Kristiansund, Mo i Rana, Narvik, Sarpsborg, Sogndal, Steinkjer, Stord and Tromsø. Each had two Norsk Data-built minicomputers, one running Sintran III and one running Unix. Participating agencies included the Regional Development Fund, the Ministry of Local Government and Regional Development, the Norwegian Telecommunications Administration (NTA), and the Royal Norwegian Council for Scientific and Industrial Research (NTNF).

The project was launched by ND and Rolf Skår in 1987 as a way to utilize a tax break through investing in regional areas. He received support from Minister Finn Kristensen, although the project met with opposition from other government agencies and the data industry. The go-ahead was given in May 1988 and the centers opened in 1989, with the first on 31 January. The project costs the government 300 million Norwegian krone (NOK), but two government reports found the project to be a failure. The centers were established with too much capacity and were unable to cover their operating costs through securing sufficient projects.

== Centers ==
The fourteen FUNN centers were located in Ålesund, Alta, Bø, Gjøvik, Grimstad, Kirkenes, Kristiansund, Mo i Rana, Narvik, Sarpsborg, Sogndal, Steinkjer, Stord and Tromsø. Each consisted of two Norsk Data minicomputers, one running Sintran III and one running Ndix, a ND-developed variant of Unix. The computers were owned by the company A/S ND-FUNN, based in Mo i Rana and which was wholly owned by Norsk Data. It received share capital from ND in such a way that ND received an identical tax break. The share capital was then used to purchase computers from Norsk Data. The centers were connected to each other. The centers were separate limited companies with various local owners which were responsible for operating the computers and selling the processing capacity to local customers and projects. The centers were not to receive any operating subsidies from the government or Norsk Data. Five years after installation the computers would be handed over free of charge from ND-FUNN to the respective centers. Each center was required to purchase services from Norsk Data for NOK 1.075 million per year, on an irrevocable contract which lasted five years.

== History ==
The initiative to FUNN was taken by Rolf Skår, who was at the time chief executive officer of Norsk Data. On 18 February 1987 he contacted the Ministry of Trade and Industry and proposed that an information superhighway be built throughout the country based on independent computer centers. ND intended to be the driving force, but had support from the NTA and NTNF. Skår's demands were that ND would be allowed to use tax money via the District Tax Act and that these would be permitted used in areas that ND did not operate in. The subsidies would be used to purchase computer manufactured by Norsk Data. Part of Norsk Data's motivation was that the tax legislation was such constructed that companies could, within given regulations and limits, receive tax breaks by investing in non-central regional districts. Norsk Data could therefore channel back part of its taxes by using it in given areas.

Permission for use of NOK 135 million in subsidies was granted by the ministry in August. The political decision to carry out the project was led by Minister of Trade and Industry Finn Kristensen and his state secretary, Kari Blegen. Thus the political decision was made before a commission could investigate if the project could be profitable and meet market demands. This was carried out by a commission led by Blegen, which published its report in December 1987. It concluded that each center would have a revenue of between NOK 6 and 8 million. This was in part based on that NTNF and NTA would purchase services for NOK 40 to 50 million per year over a period of four years. Each center would need NOK 2.3 million in subsidies per year, which would be financed through supporting projects which would purchase services from them.

Fifty-one municipalities applied to join the project and fourteen were selected. The computing industry warned against the proposals, which would use ND's proprietary minicomputers instead of open standard servers and personal computers. Another concern which was voiced was that if fifteen new computing centers were to be established, it would either have to be at the expense of existing major centers, such as the Norwegian Computing Center and SINTEF, or would have to receive subsidies. The project was also disapproved of by the Ministry of Finance, the Ministry of Education and Research and the Regional Development Fund, but the issue was carried through by the Ministry of Trade and Industry.

The project was approved by the government in May 1988. The first center, in Mo i Rana, opened on 31 January 1989 and was opened by Prime Minister Gro Harlem Brundtland and Kristensen. The centers were established under the presumption that they would be fully occupied with publicly financed projects, but in reality they were forced to attempt to find various private projects and all had too much capacity. They thus became a financial failure because they had massive overcapacity in computing power and few project which were able to pay for the costs. By 1991, one of the centers was bankrupt and the rest were struggling financially. The only center with success was the one in Tromsø, which was used for Tromsø Satellite Station. However, even the viable projects had no apparent need for the high-end, high-cost systems featured in the initiative.

Subsidies for the centers had reached NOK 300 million by 1991. Two public evaluations with of the project concluded that it was a failure. The main finding was that the decision to establish the centers had been taken early in the process and that reports and later work were then carried out to find areas to serve, instead of establishing if there was a market for the amount of centers. According to the report from Nordlandsforskning, only Norsk Data gained from the project. The overcapacity and costs tied up 92 percent of the public information technology budget, hindering other project which could have created value from being carried out. Lack of projects caused FUNN to not result in any advantages to the communities where it was located.

By 1991 the technology used was obsolete, in part because of the use of proprietary systems instead of open Unix-based systems. Norsk Data never managed the transition to open standards and also ceased operations. By then the personal computer had also become commonplace and the need for a central terminal server had disappeared. By 1991, Skår had become director of NTNF and was responsible for evaluating the project.
