= ND-COSMOS =

ND-COSMOS was the proprietary computer networking system developed by Norsk Data as the second generation NORDNET system.

It offered very tight integration with the ND-NOTIS applications, as well as the SINTRAN III operating systems. In many ways, it was a strong parallel to DEC's DECnet Phase IV system.

The network system was peer-to-peer, and the NOTIS document storage system could also have redundant servers, which made for very good service reliability.

The name was internally a pun on its recently released small computer, known as the ND Satellite.

It could function on a wide variety of different link layers, including Ethernet, X.25, HDLC, Bisync, and asynchronous serial ports.
