= Simulation for Automatic Machinery =

Two minicomputers built in Norway

Simulation for Automatic Machinery or SAM were two unique minicomputers built by the Norwegian Defence Research Establishment (NDRE) in the mid-1960s. SAM 1, built between 1962 and 1964, was the first Norwegian-built programmable computer. It featured 4,096 14-bit words of memory and 14 registers and was used in-house at NDRE. SAM 2 was built between 1966 and 1967 and was used for analysis of satellite imagery at Tromsø Satellite Station. A third-generation computer, it was among the first three in the world to use integrated circuits.

NDRE's first computer had been Lydia which was used for anti-submarine warfare. When it was completed in 1962, the design group led by Yngvar Lundh started working on SAM 1. After it was completed, NDRE convinced the satellite station to procure a Norwegian computer, despite that it had yet to be developed. Key people in the SAM 2 development were Lars Monrad-Krohn, Per Bjørge and Rolf Skår. On the basis of SAM 2 they established Norsk Data and developed the Nord-1 minicomputer.

== Development ==
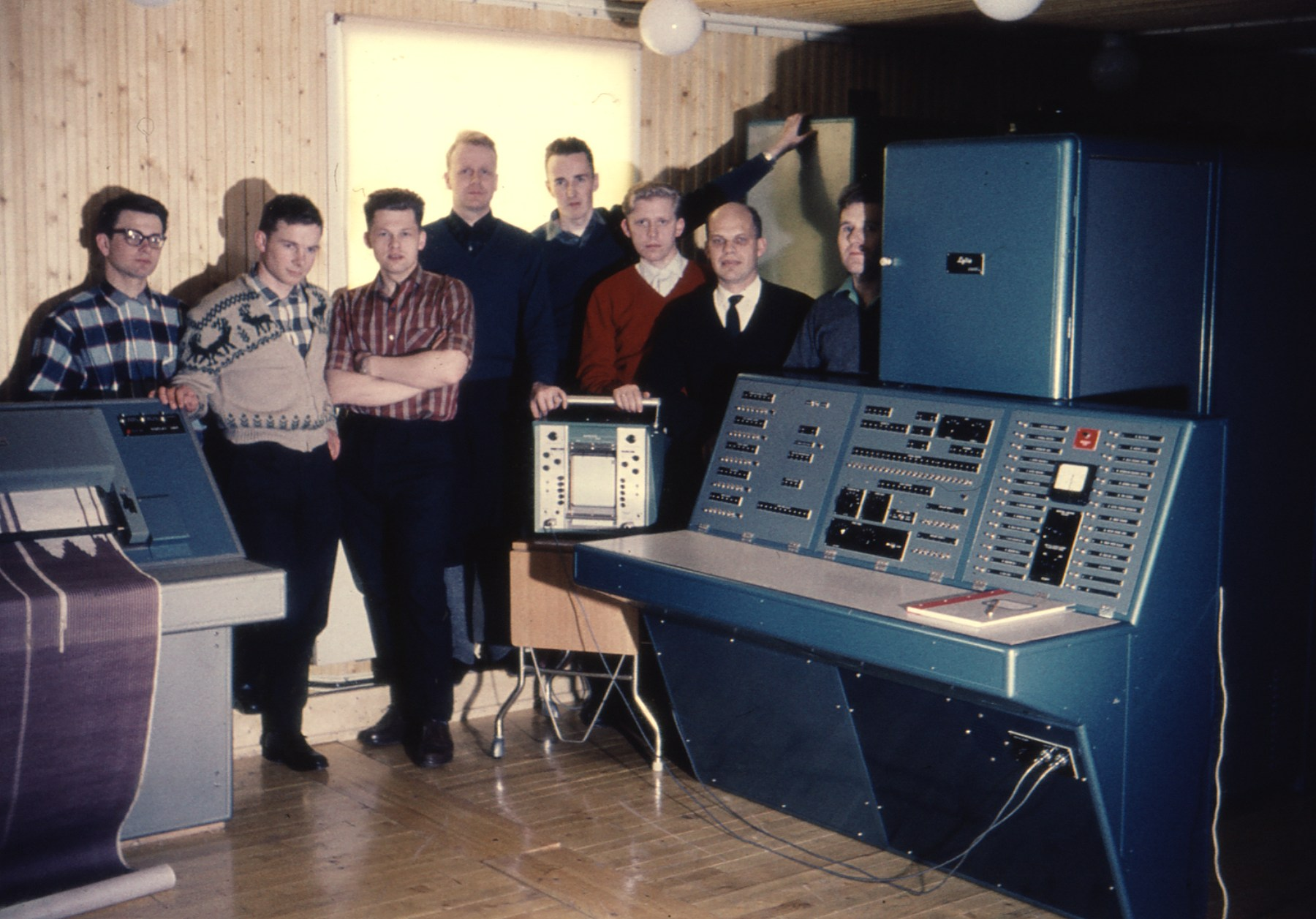
Per Bugge-Asperheim, Svein Strøm, Per Klevan, Lars Monrad-Krohn, Per Bjørge, Asbjørn Horn, Olav Landsverk and Yngvar Lundh which made up the NDRE's digital division in 1962

The first attempts by NDRE to build a computer were made by the mathematics division in the early 1950s. There were two main intended uses: calculation of orbital mechanics for ballistic missiles and for the dimensions for Kjeller Reactor. The background was that NDRE had a keypunch machine, but there were no commercially available digital computers. In 1953 NDRE was offered a digital Ferranti computer via the Norwegian Intelligence Service and the agency thus terminated its own computer development and instead focused on software.

The development of SAM arose in the NDRE's servo division. Led by Karl Holberg, it was working on Terne, an anti-submarine warfare system. The system relied on an analogue electromechanical computer and NDRE saw the possibility of using digital computers instead. Yngvar Lundh wrote his master's thesis in engineering at NDRE in 1957 and then studied at Massachusetts Institute of Technology in the US where he encountered the TX-2 minicomputer. When he returned to NDRE, Lundh started working on a digital computer named Lydia for Bridge, an anti-submarine system. Holberg became director of the telecommunications division in 1962 and Lundh's group moved there.

Holberg gave the go-ahead for the development of a minicomputer in mid 1962 and was to be a further development of Lydia. The goal was not to make a computer that could compete with commercial models, but instead be tailored for use internally in NDRE for research of computers and simulation. SAM was completed in 1964 and used in-house at NDRE. It was the first Norwegian-built computer which could be programmed.

The Royal Norwegian Council for Scientific and Industrial Research (NTNF) and NDRE started negotiating a satellite ground station in Tromsø in 1965. It and Kongsfjord Telemetry Station in Ny-Ålesund were to be used by the European Space Research Organization for their low-Earth-orbit satellites starting with ESRO-2. The agreement was approved by the Parliament of Norway in mid 1966. Part of the reason for the Norwegian support was the opportunity of training Norwegians in pulse-code modulation and digital computing. The agreement involved that NDRE was to supply a minicomputer for Tromsø.

The choice of computer for the Tromsø station became a major part of the negotiations. NDRE argued that it was fully capable of delivering such a system, but NTNF instead wanted to safe by buying the PDP-8 from Digital Equipment Corporation in the United States. NDRE was awarded the contract in part because of NTNF's obligation to support Norwegian technology and in part because NDRE agreed to purchase a suitable foreign computer if they could not successfully manufacture one themselves. The thought was that it would be possible to construct a Norwegian computer for the same price as an off-the-shelf computer given that the wages at NDRE were not included. NDRE was able to make an agreement with Chr. Michelsen Institute which allowed them to borrow their computer in case SAM 2 did not work.

NDRE had in the meantime hired two graduates, Rolf Skår and Per Bjørge, who became a core of the development group. SAM 2 was the first in Europe and among the first three in the world which used integrated circuits. The computer was built by two groups, both of which put in 14-hour shifts. Construction was completed several months before the deadline.

== Specifications ==
SAM 1 had a main memory of 4,096 words, each 24 bits long. It had seven 14-bit index registers, eight special purpose registers, three data registers, an accumulator, a screen, a light pen, a punch card reader and a Flexowriter. It had a flexible input and output system and was connected to NDRE's CDC 3600.

== Legacy ==
As there was time between SAM 2 was completed and it had to be in Tromsø, the designers took it on a tour to Bergen and Trondheim. While in Bergen the group met an old fellow student who was working as an entrepreneur and the designers decided to establish a computer manufacturing company. This resulted in the establishment of Norsk Data, a major manufacturer of minicomputers. At the company's peak in 1987 it was one of Norway's largest companies and more than 3,600 people.

SAM 1 is on display at the Norwegian Museum of Science and Technology.
