= ENQUIRE =

Defunct software project

- Inventor: Tim Berners-Lee
- Inception: 1980
- Manufacturer: CERN

ENQUIRE was a software project written in 1980 by Tim Berners-Lee at CERN, which was the predecessor to the World Wide Web. It was a simple hypertext program that had some of the same ideas as the Web and the Semantic Web but was different in several important ways.

According to Berners-Lee, the name was inspired by the title of an old how-to book, Enquire Within upon Everything.

== The conditions ==
Around 1980, approximately 10,000 people were working at CERN with different hardware, software and individual requirements. Much work was done by email and file exchange, which the scientists used to keep track of different parts of intersecting projects. Berners-Lee started to work for 6 months on 23 June 1980 at CERN, where he developed ENQUIRE as a personal organizational tool. The requirements for setting up a new system were compatibility with different networks, disk formats, data formats, and character encoding schemes, which made any attempt to transfer information between dissimilar systems a daunting and generally impractical task. When Berners-Lee built ENQUIRE, he was not aware of the prior ideas about Memex, NLS and Project Xanadu developed by Vannevar Bush, Douglas Engelbart and Ted Nelson. Only after his work on ENQUIRE, as Berners-Lee began to refine his ideas, did the work of these predecessors help to confirm the legitimacy of his concept.

== Differences to the World Wide Web ==
Documentation of the RPC project                       (concept)


   Most of the documentation is available on VMS, with the two
   principle manuals being stored in the CERNDOC system.

    1) includes: The VAX/NOTES conference VXCERN::RPC
    2) includes: Test and Example suite
    3) includes: RPC BUG LISTS
    4) includes: RPC System: Implementation Guide
       Information for maintenance, porting, etc.
    5) includes: Suggested Development Strategy for RPC Applications
    6) includes: "Notes on RPC", Draft 1, 20 feb 86
    7) includes: "Notes on Proposed RPC Development" 18 Feb 86
    8) includes: RPC User Manual
       How to build and run a distributed system.
    9) includes: Draft Specifications and Implementation Notes
   10) includes: The RPC HELP facility
   11) describes: THE REMOTE PROCEDURE CALL PROJECT in DD/OC





 Help  Display  Select  Back  Quit Mark  Goto_mark  Link  Add  Edit

A screen in an ENQUIRE scheme.

ENQUIRE had pages called cards and hyperlinks within the cards. The links had different meanings and about a dozen relationships which were displayed to the creator, things, documents and groups described by the card. The relationship between the links could be seen by everybody explaining what the need of the link was or what happened if a card was removed. Everybody was allowed to add new cards but they always needed an existing card.

Relationship	Inverse Relationship
made	was made by
includes	is part of
uses	is used by
describes	is described by

ENQUIRE was closer to a modern wiki than to a web site:

- database, though a closed system (all of the data could be taken as a workable whole)
- bidirectional hyperlinks (in Wikipedia and MediaWiki, this is approximated by the What links here feature). This bidirectionality allows ideas, notes, etc. to link to each other without the author being aware of this. In a way, they (or, at least, their relationships) get a life of their own.
- direct editing of the server (like wikis and CMS/blogs)
- ease of compositing, particularly when it comes to hyperlinking.

The World Wide Web was created to unify the different existing systems at CERN like ENQUIRE, the CERNDOC, VMS Notes and the USENET.

== Why ENQUIRE failed ==
Berners-Lee came back to CERN in 1984 and intensively used his own system. He realized that most of the time coordinating the project was to keep information up to date. He recognized that a system similar to ENQUIRE was needed, "but accessible to everybody." There was a need that people be able to create cards independently of others and to link to other cards without updating the linked card. This idea is the big difference and the cornerstone to the World Wide Web. Berners-Lee didn't make ENQUIRE suitable for other persons to use the system successfully, and in other CERN divisions there were similar situations to the division he was in. Another problem was that external links, for example to existing databases, weren't allowed, and that the system wasn't powerful enough to handle enough connections to the database.

Further development stopped because Berners-Lee gave the ENQUIRE disc to Robert Cailliau, who had been working under Brian Carpenter before he left CERN. Carpenter suspects that the disc was reused for other purposes since nobody was later available to do further work on ENQUIRE. The source code of ENQUIRE is lost, although a user's manual for it survives.

== Technical ==
The application ran on terminal with plaintext 24x80. The first version was able to hyperlink between files. ENQUIRE was written in the Pascal programming language and implemented on a Norsk Data NORD-10 under SINTRAN III, and version 2 was later ported to MS-DOS and to VAX/VMS. The nature of ENQUIRE has been misunderstood by some to erroneously conclude that the World Wide Web was "developed on a Norsk Data machine".

== See also ==
- Gopher (protocol) – another hypertext protocol
- History of the Internet
- History of the World Wide Web
