= Tromsø Satellite Station =

Satellite earth station in Tromsø, Norway

Coordinates: 69.6618°N 18.9417°E

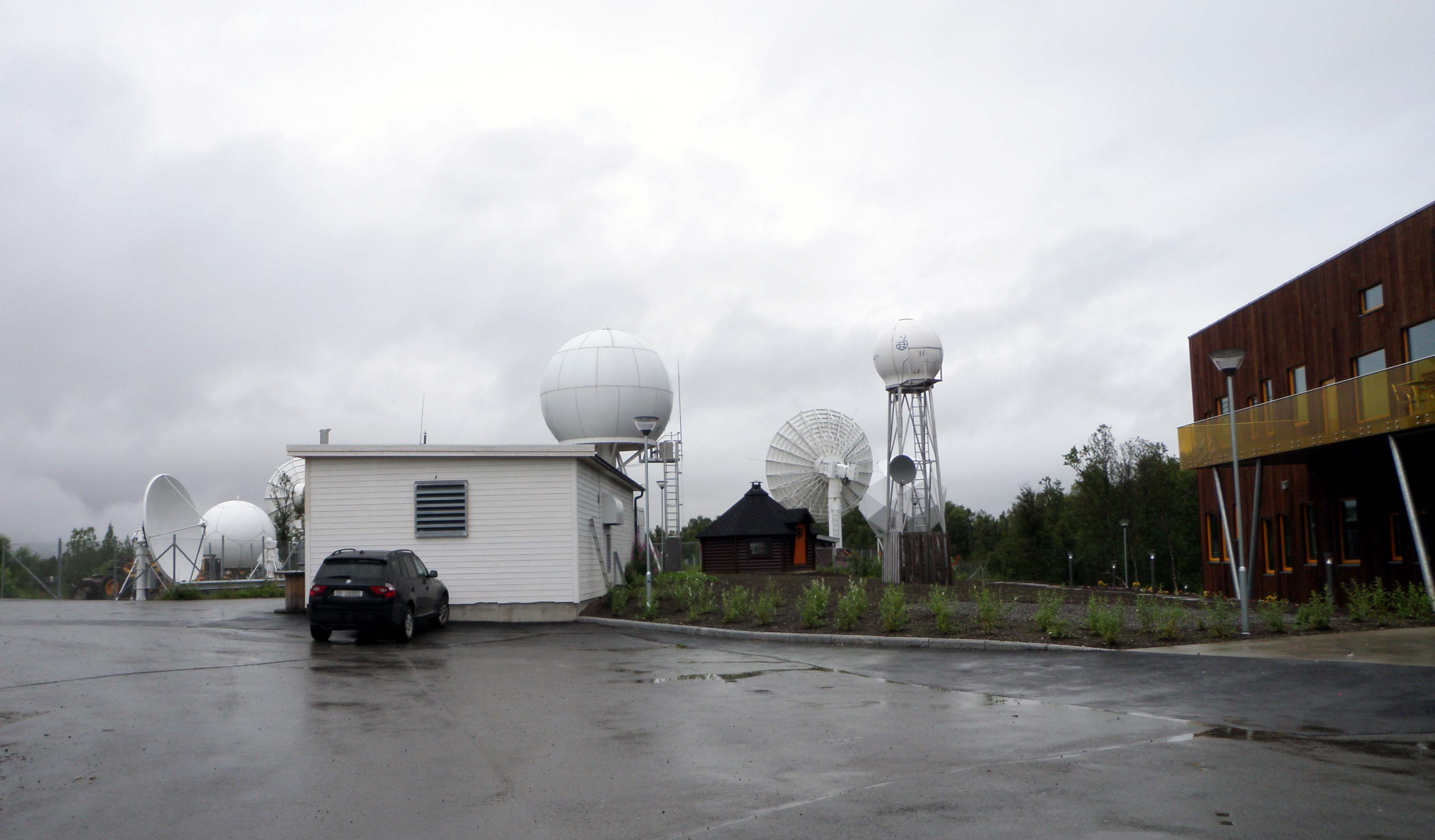
Tromsø Satellite Station (2013)

Tromsø Satellite Station (Norwegian: Tromsø Satellittstasjon, TSS), until 1988 known as Tromsø Telemetry Station (Norwegian: Tromsø telemetristasjon), is a satellite earth station located in Tromsø, Norway. The facility is owned by Kongsberg Satellite Services (KSAT), a joint venture between the Kongsberg Group and Space Norway AS. In addition to hosting its own antennas serving thirty satellites, TSS acts as the center-point of KSAT's operations and provides backbone services for the high Arctic Svalbard Satellite Station (SvalSat) and the Antarctic Troll Satellite Station (TrollSat).

Originally proposed in 1965, the station was established by the Royal Norwegian Council for Scientific and Industrial Research (NTNF) in 1967 in close cooperation with the Norwegian Defence Research Establishment (NDRE) and located adjacent to Tromsø Geophysical Observatory. From its inception until 1974, it served low-Earth-orbit (LEO) satellites operated by the European Space Research Organization (ESRO). To a lesser extent it was also used by Canadian Space Agency and National Aeronautics and Space Administration (NASA) LEO satellites. Norway's non-membership in ESRO and later the European Space Agency (ESA) caused Tromsø to not become a ground station for Landsat. A gradual increase in operations occurred from 1982, such as for the International Cospas-Sarsat Programme and the European Remote-Sensing Satellite. TSS became part of NSC in 1990, although it was partially sold to the Swedish Space Corporation (SSC) in 1995. SvalSat merged with TSS in 2002 to form KSAT.

== History ==
=== Establishment and use by ESRO ===
The first proposals for a telemetry station in Tromsø were made in early 1964. The concept was to build a real-time telemetry station which would allow for simultaneous observations of the ionosphere from both satellites and sounding rockets. The idea was backed by Norway's Space Research Committee. Ideas for a real-time telemetry station also arose in ESRO and NTNF included the project in its five-year space program in 1965. Similar proposals were made in northern Sweden and a race started between Norwegian and Swedish interests to gain ESRO's support for a station. Norway had budgetary limitations prohibiting a full-scale station, and instead support was gained from the United States and Canada. The project was also backed by NDRE.

The choice of Tromsø as a location for a telemetry stations was in part tied to the Tromsø Geophysical Observatory—which had been located in Tromsø since 1928—and the planned University of Tromsø. The Canadian Space Agency was at the time working on the Alouette 2 program and were seen by NDRE as a natural cooperation partner. The NASA's International Satellite for Ionospheric Studies was also being designed and NASA therefore decided to supply equipment for a telemetry station in Tromsø to be operational by August 1966.

Parallel to NDRE's work, NTNF was working with ESRO to gain support for a telemetry station. There was a degree of urgency as ESRO wanted the facility completed by 1967 in time for the launch of the spacecraft ESRO-2. NTNF and ESRO were also working on the establishment of Kongsfjord Telemetry Station in Ny-Ålesund. The agreement to build the station was approved by the Parliament of Norway in mid 1966. Part of the reason for the Norwegian support was the opportunity of training Norwegians in pulse-code modulation and digital computing. For NDRE the station was a chance to apply its latest minicomputer, the Simulation for Automatic Machinery (SAM).

A major planning issue was the need for a minicomputer at the station. NDRE argued that it was fully capable of delivering such a system, but NTNF instead wanted to minimize risk by buying the PDP-8 from Digital Equipment Corporation in the United States. However, NDRE was awarded the contract, in part because of NTNF's obligation to support Norwegian technology and in part because NDRE agreed to purchase a suitable foreign computer if they could not successfully manufacture one themselves. A new minicomputer, SAM-2, was built at NDRE and completed in April 1967. It was the first computer built in Europe and among the first three in the world which used integrated circuits. SAM-2 was so successful that the developers established Norsk Data to commercialize the technology.

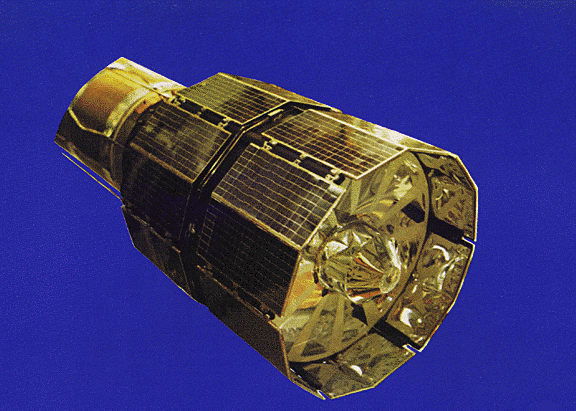
ESRO-2B, one of the early users of TSS

The contract with ESRO resulted in TSS providing telemetry for ESRO-IA, ESRO-IB, ESRO-2B, HEOS-1, HEOS-2, TD-1A and ESRO-4, all of which had low Earth orbits. The two telemetry stations used a large portion of the Norwegian space budget, but became platforms which allowed for development of technology. Tromsø Satellite Station worked well in tandem with Andøya Rocket Range and became an international center for study of the auroral zone. The University of Tromsø was established in 1968 and started teaching in 1972. The same year, it took over the geophysical observatory and cosmic geophysics became one of the university's fields of excellence.

The original contract with ESRO lasted until 1 July 1974, when their low-Earth-orbit program terminated. NTNF proposed closing Tromsø Telemetry Station as the remaining customers did not provide sufficient revenue to keep operations viable. Norway also declined to join the European Space Agency (ESA), which resulted in little hope in ESA choosing to cooperate with a Norwegian earth station. NTNF also looked into outright selling the station to ESA, but the offer was turned down. Kongsfjord Telemetry Station was closed in 1974.

=== Commercialization ===
In 1973 NTNF started planning to use the station for downloading from NASA's Landsat program. Sufficient funding from the government was secured in mid 1976, after a successful lobby operation which emphasized the possibility of environmental observation in Norway's territorial waters. 7.5 million Norwegian krone (NOK) was granted for upgrades in 1977. Norway entered negotiations with the US, but soon ESA and NASA started discussions regarding two European telemetry stations for Landsat to serve all ESA members. ESA and Sweden pushed for Kiruna, Sweden, to be the location of ESA's northern telemetry station and Tromsø was discarded because of Norway's decision to not join ESA.

Norway expanded its exclusive economic zone to 200 nautical miles (370 km; 230 mi) in 1977, increasing the country's land and sea area by more than one million square kilometers (400,000 sq mi). Because of the reserves of fish and oil it became imperative for the Norwegian government to conduct surveillance. NTNF therefore commenced work to establish an earth station for NASA's Seasat, which was approved by Parliament in early 1977. A processing computer was developed as a cooperation between the Norwegian Institute of Technology, NDRE, NTNF and Norsk Data, which was tailored to analyze Seasat's synthetic aperture radar (SAR) and named Computer of Experimental SAR. Seasat A failed after 104 days and Tromsø had by that time been used for telemetry for two minutes.

TSS did not become operational again until 1982, when the International Cospas-Sarsat Programme made use of the station. The Ministry of Trade and Industry took a renewed interest in the satellite station in the early 1980s and proposed in 1982 that Norway join ESA's European Remote-Sensing Satellite (ERS) program. This started the process of Norway becoming a full member of ESA in 1987. The telemetry station received investments of NOK 100 million during the 1980s and was organized as a foundation in 1984. It took the name Tromsø Satellite Station in 1988. Part of the goal of the project was to create technical spin-offs; the one successful company was Spacetec, which had 45 employees at the time it was bought by Kongsberg Defence & Aerospace in 1994. By then it had become a global manufacturer of Earth observation ground stations.

The Norwegian Space Centre was established as a foundation on 5 July 1987, under the protection of the Ministry of Trade and Industry. It immediately took over Andøya Rocket Range and TSS followed suit in 1990. TSS was upgraded in 1991 to be able to operate with ERS-1. In 1995 NRS established a subsidiary, Norwegian Space Centre Property, to own the facilities in Tromsø and Longyearbyen. The same year, TSS was converted to a limited company, of which half was sold to the Swedish Space Corporation (SSC). The aim was that TSS would operate as a fully commercial enterprise. Its first major contract was with the Canadian Radarsat.

After Rolf Skår was appointed director of NSC, plans were launched to try to win the ground station contract for NASA's planned Earth Observing System (EOS). NASA was considering locating the ground station in Greenland, at McMurdo Station in Antarctica or at Esrange in Sweden. Skår invited a NASA delegation to visit Svalbard, and from 1996 NSC and NASA started negotiating a contract to establish a ground station at Longyearbyen. The first satellite to use SvalSat was Landsat 7, which was launched on 15 April 1999. NSC bought SSC's ownership in TSS and Lockheed Martin's ownership in SvalSat in 2001. On 1 February 2002, NSC and Kongsberg Spacetec merged their interests in satellite technology and operations into Kongsberg Satellite Station, which became the sole owner of both SvalSat and TSS. Legally, Kongsberg Satellite Services is a continuation of the operating company of TSS. KSAT opened Troll Satellite Station in 2007.

== Operations ==
TSS is owned and operated by Kongsberg Satellite Services (KSAT), which is again equally owned by Kongsberg Defence and Aerospace and Space Norway AS, the latter which is a company owned by the Ministry of Industry, Commerce and Fisheries. KSAT is not tied to a particular operator of satellites and the antennas communicate with multiple satellites, thus reducing costs compared to dedicated ground stations. For a typical satellite, data is delivered to the end customer no more than thirty minutes after downloading.

The site is only able to communicate with LEO satellites in ten of their fourteen orbits, unlike SvalSat and TrollSat which can communicate in all orbits. All three stations are interconnected and communicate with the Tromsø Network Operations Center, which is part of the TSS complex. This allows for redundancy as TSS, SvalSat and TrollSat can be used to communicate with all satellites connected to the system. The operation center is responsible for backup, scheduling and conflict resolution, in addition to network planning, customer support and ground station control. The facilities use interoperability and shared ground services, such as a common protocol for communication and similar design of the antennas, to increase flexibility and reduce costs and risk.

The antennas at TSS serve more than thirty missions and contain both a multi-frequency uplink and L, S and X band downlink. In addition there are customer-owned reception, telemetry, tracking and control systems. TSS acts as a local user terminal for the Cospas-Sarsat system used for search and rescue. By using a combination of SvalSat and TrollSat, customers can download data twice per orbit, twenty-six times per day, with only a forty-minute maximum delay. These are the only two ground stations able to communicate with all orbits of LEO satellites. Tromsø is connected to SvalSat via the Svalbard Undersea Cable System.
