= TDV 2200 =

Series of terminals produced by Tandberg Data

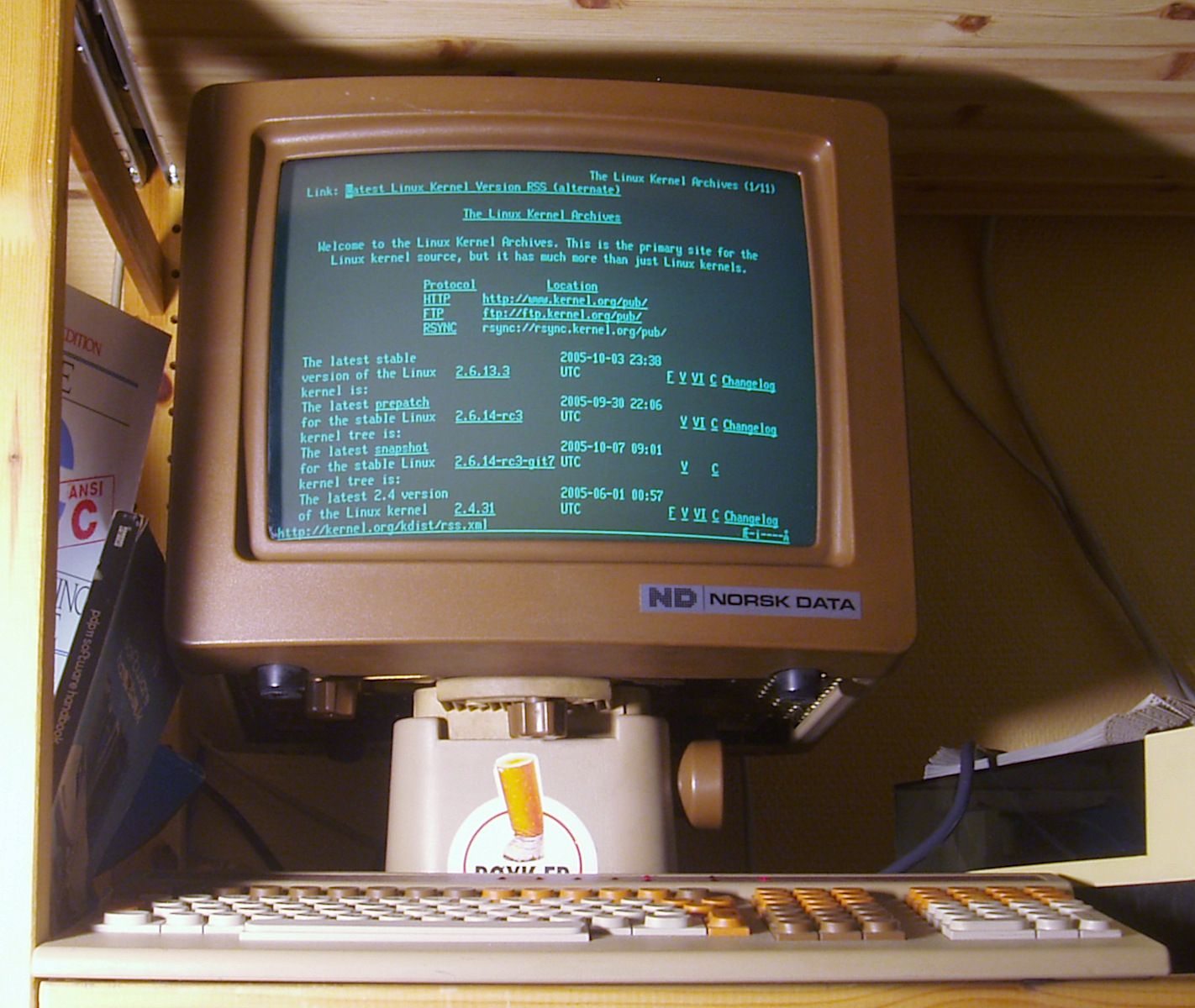
A TDV-2215

TDV-2200 was a series of terminals produced by Tandberg Data from the early 1980s.

Norsk Data sold rebranded versions of the TDV 2200 series under their own designations ND-240/242 (TDV-2215 variants), ND-246/266/267 (TDV-2200/9 variants) and ND-320 (TDV-2200/9S). The rebranded TDV-2200/9(S) terminals had keyboards customized for the ND-NOTIS text processing system.

For Siemens, Tandberg build the similar MTS 2000 series.

Another important customer was Mycron.

It optionally used ISO 646-NO for mapping of the Norwegian characters, which made them a pet hate among UNIX people. (Some users still humorously pronounce the vertical bar as "ø".)

Versions with vector graphics were available, as were versions supporting Thai script and other scripts.

It won several awards for ergonomic design, and its keyboard was widely considered to be one of the best on the market.

Its immediate predecessor was the TDV-2100 series, and its successor was the TDV-1200.
