= ND-NOTIS =

Office automation suite by Norsk Data

ND-NOTIS was an office automation suite by Norsk Data introduced in the early 80s, running on the SINTRAN III platform on both ND-100 and ND-500 architectures. It was also available on Microsoft Windows running in networks of Norsk Data servers.

== Overview ==
ND-NOTIS was successful, and was the main product line of the company for quite a while, cementing its position in the Norwegian government office automation market. It was also widespread in Germany and in the UK (local municipality, DHSS etc.)

The NOTIS family of products was presented to the British Computer Society by Jeremy Salter. Roger Tagg et al. (BCS, End User SG, 1985) and was received with praise as the BCS model for user interface. The same praise was awarded to NOTIS-IR as a model for information storage and retrieval. The European Commission published in 1985 NOTIS-IR as reference model for document and information search and retrieval.

ND-NOTIS was unique for its time and had innovative features like multilingual input and search.

Norsk Data also sold custom-made Tandberg Data TDV-2200 terminals as "NOTIS terminals" with special keys for text editing. Other terminals were "endorsed", provided new keycaps and branded as "NOTIS Terminals" - including the Facit "Twist" - that would show a page standing.

== Components ==
Components initially included the following:

NOTIS-WP
NOTIS Word Processor, a full text editing environment optimized for word processing.
NOTIS-IR
NOTIS Information Retrieval, a document database with free text search allowing full multi-site search.
NOTIS-QL
NOTIS Query Language, a database query and application generation program, utilising a high-level querying language called ACCESS, predecessor to MS Access.
NOTIS-ID
NOTIS mail system. Proprietary e-mail system. It was later interfaced to Notis-Mail (see below).
NOTIS-RG
NOTIS Report Generator, a powerful data extracting and modifying system. Often used together with database systems like SIBAS, Mimer or Oracle.
NOTIS-PM
NOTIS Personal Meeting calendar, permitting the scheduling of meetings and their attendees.

Components introduced later included the following:

NOTIS-DS
NOTIS Document Store, a database of documents based on the SIBAS database.
NOTIS-BS
NOTIS Backup System, an advanced system used for automated and incremental backups of a DS document store.
NOTIS-Mail
NOTIS full X.400 e-mail system, including an X.500 based directory service (implemented using SIBAS) and TCP/IP based SMTP mail. This provided HTML formatted messages in from 1985.
NOTIS-TF
NOTIS Text Formatter, a text formatting system.
NOTIS-RP
NOTIS Report Producer, closely integrated with NOTIS-RG.
NOTIS-CALC
NOTIS Spreadsheet program, similar to VisiCalc and later successors like Microsoft Excel
NOTIS-ENCRYPT
NOTIS Encryption software.

== General ==
NOTIS was unique then. It captured the notion of different user interfaces, or terminals; and managed a common user interface for all applications that used the platform. So a key on the keyboard would in all applications "mean" the same.

It relied on an interface system "User Environment" to hold in one place all user profile and preferences. That is everything from log-in name and password, language preference, application skills and user rights to see, edit and change document - or data in applications. It came as a full "Document management" package, with full support for workflow - which was used by 3rd party application software.

Another first was multi-lingual support, - also part of the user interface. Regardless of where you logged on, the system would know of your preferences, and allow you to resume last task. The system also supported full editing from right to left. All deliveries to the Norwegian public sector required capability to use three language, and that in the same office, all three languages would be used, even in the same document. So to sell in its main market, it need multilingual support. That included all messages, error messages and user interaction. The error messages could also be adapter from "novice" to "expert".

Another feature was the full support for SGML - or "S-code". This allow the text editor to be used to edit and view the first HTML documents created - on hardware running NOTIS. The alternate character set - "T-code" was the CCITT, now ITU T.56 standard character set - used in all television sets to show teletext/"Text TV". So, the systems had full support for semi-graphical input and display, but just a few terminals supported this. Beware that an important customer was CERN, where they at the end of the 1980s worked on what you are now using - the WWW. ND-NOTIS had full support for HTML at that time.

The main selling point was the - WYSIWYG - What you see is what you get. In 1983, most text editors used "codes" that had to be inserted in the text, like "^p" meaning "paragraph. Even in the early days of text editors on Windows, most text systems were like that. However, NOTIS-WP, would show where the line ended and a new page started for a long time. The Standard Generalized Markup Language was developed as an international standard, and version 2 of this is the "Extended SGML" or XML that is approved by ODMA.

The "back-end" to all these modules were also flexible. You had direct file system exposure - that included network mounted files. However, with NOTIS-DS it included "Document Storage" and management - a full Electronic Document Management System (as found in systems such as Documentum and OpenText's Livelink today). The EDMS was based on a generic software interface, but only SIBAS was used commercially. This allowed fully localisation transparent document storage and retrieval. That of course demanded NOTIS-IR to search in all the documents. Software today used to power both Google and Altavista.

NOTIS-ID was an alternative NOTIS-DS, with restricted functionality, in that this would interface to mail exchanges only. So if you stored a document to an email-recipient, you sent an email. Likewise, if you received an email, this would appear in your mail-count, and you could read it in NOTIS-WP like any other document.

Norsk Data needed NOTIS to avoid duplicating applications. So the software was used in professional text production systems, for newspaper and magazine production - by "NORTEXT". It was reviewed a number of times here and found to be "best of breed" by e.g. the Seybold Report on newspaper systems. Hence demanding users were close to the developers - which may explain the success.

== Applications beside Text and Document Management ==
The list here will become endless since NOTIS was linked to three application generators - beside the Query part. All of these were fully capable of making large applications system, that could also update databases. The most successful link was to "Unique" - an application package developed outside Norsk Data to support SIBAS but later was enhanced to interface to a number of RDBMS. Unique was successful in the UK, implementing systems for the DHSS and local municipalities. The other platforms were "BIM" (Business Information Systems) and "ABM" (Application Building and Maintenance). A full interface was made to "Systemator" to provide full support to newspaper systems generated by this. Norsk Data marketed and sold the system as integrated with their offerings for the medical sector ("Infomedica") and hospital systems;- for local community in Scandinavia and the UK based on Unique(i.e.DIALOGUE-1); - for engineering documentation in Europe: CAD/CAM as Technovision and even to the F-16 Flight Simulator.

NOTIS-QL - also marketed by Norsk Data as "Access-1", is still commercially available as "QBEvision". It has also been licensed under several names with full product sold by CA.

The NOTIS family was fully ported to Microsoft Windows, but was difficult to move with its customer base. For a time there were plans to include "Ami" into the family, - but its very difficult to move when your users do not want to make the change.

The NOTIS family was ported to Norsk Data NDIX Unix line, but here suffered because Unix had problems with coping with the key sequences required (terminfo/termcap was incomplete compared to the proprietary "VTM".). This is still used in telecommunication, all SMS messages use this character set.

== External ==
The NOTIS way of sorting was included in the first version of Sybase, which was acquired by Microsoft as DS1. This taught Microsoft to arrange sort sequences in Windows according to national character sets ("codepage").

NOTIS-WP was the testbed for SGML and HTML. A very visible remnant of NOTIS-WP is the font size parameter in HTML: 1 for tiny and all the way up to 5 for huge.

There is still no other system available that will grant you "only one user interface and make all into one system". You have to fill in the expense report in Oracle HR and type the letter summarising the reason for the expense in some other text editor. With Notis, you clicked on field for providing the information, and WP would fire up, allowing you to write the letter - not as in Wikipedia where you have to supply own mark-up, but with the document template ready. The complete document would then be stored in the application database, with the expense report data.

== See also ==
- History of Norsk Data
