= ND-500 =

32-bit superminicomputer delivered in 1981 by Norsk Data

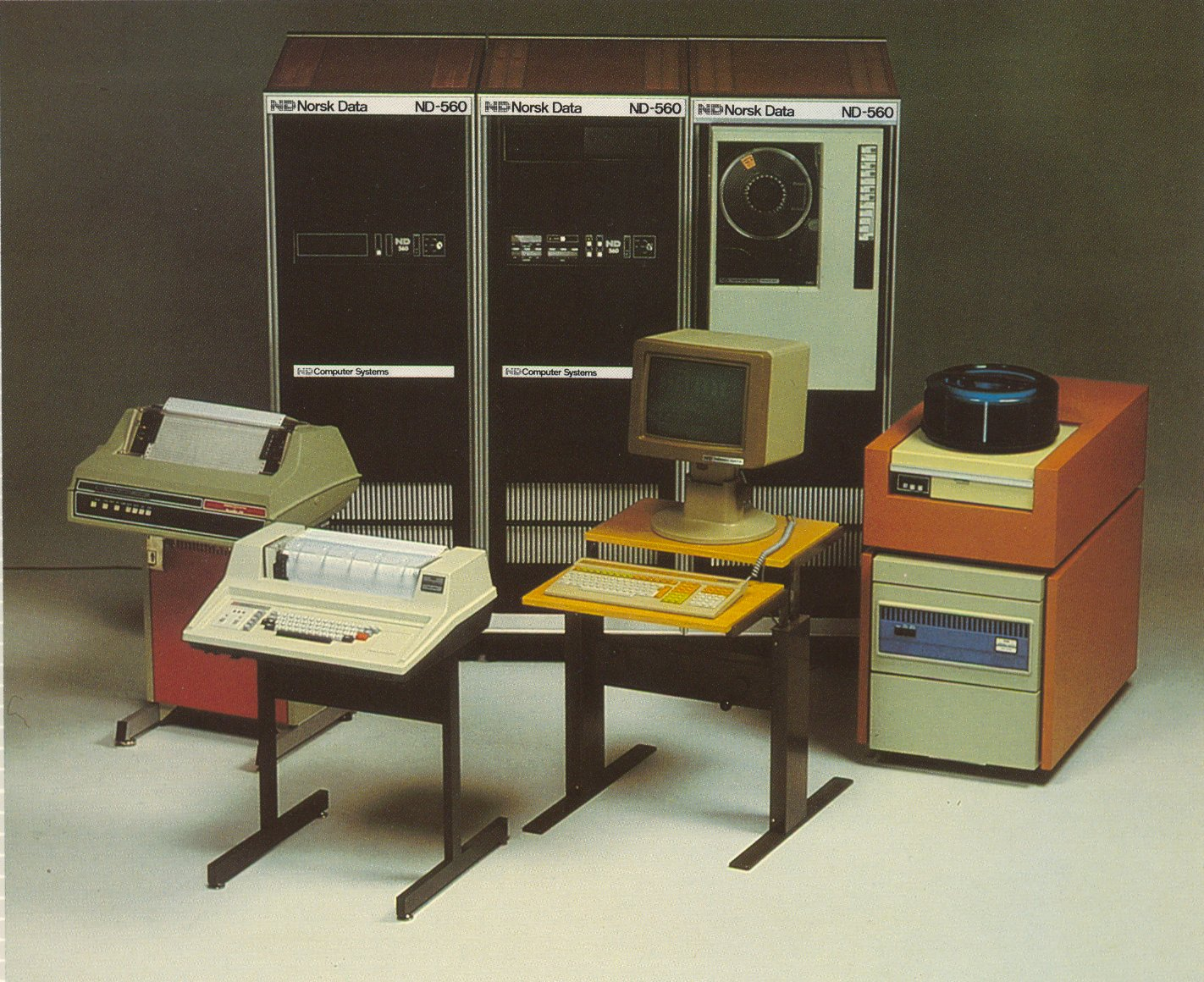
A typical large ND-500 configuration.

The ND-500 was a 32-bit superminicomputer delivered in 1981 by Norsk Data priced from £75,000 for the base model. It relied on a ND-100 to do housekeeping tasks and run the OS, SINTRAN III. A configuration could feature up to four ND-500 CPUs in a shared-memory configuration.

== System architecture ==
The ND-500 combined a 32-bit system based on one or more Nord-500 or ND-500 processors with a ND-100 minicomputer responsible for input/output handling, job scheduling, management of the ND-500 system, and providing a multi-user environment based on the SINTRAN III/VS operating system. This arrangement largely preserved the general architecture of systems based on the preceding Nord-5 and Nord-50 models, and in keeping with those models, the 32-bit component of the ND-500 was aimed at "simulation, numerical analysis and scientific" workloads.

The ND-500 processor employed split data and instruction caches, running with a 110 nanosecond cycle time, along with similarly separated memory management units, thus permitting access to a full 32-bit address space for both program instructions and data. A total 32 MB of physical memory was supported. Physical memory was shared between the ND-100 and ND-500 systems, exposed in a "multiport" arrangement, with the ND-500 having two paths to this RAM, the ND-100 having one path, and the direct memory access hardware having its own path. A prefetch processor was used to decode instructions fetched from memory, to populate the execution pipeline, and to initiate memory accesses for referenced addresses. This processor operated concurrently with the arithmetic logic unit.

== Processor architecture ==
The instruction set of the ND-500, featuring "184 basic instruction codes" specialised by several data types and addressing modes, along with "few and specialized" registers, lent itself to an instruction encoding of only one or two bytes, albeit with the potential for several accompanying operands, up to 256 in number. Operands could be from one to nine bytes in length, and thus the documentation for the ND-500 notes, "The shortest instructions are one byte long, the longest may be several thousand bytes long." This contrasted strongly with the design of the CPU in its predecessor, the Nord-50, which featured 32-bit instructions in only three formats and the availability of 64 general-purpose registers.

The ND-500 processor provides only four 32-bit registers for use as integer accumulators or index registers, I_{1} through I_{4}, and four 32-bit registers for use as floating-point accumulators, A_{1} through A_{4}, each extended by one of four extension registers, E_{1} through E_{4}, to provide 64-bit registers for double-precision floating-point operations. Base registers B and R provide access to local variables and record storage respectively. Several other special-purpose registers are provided such as the program counter (P), link or subroutine return address (L), top-of-stack (TOS), plus registers related to trap handling, processor status, and process characteristics. Of the 50 documented registers in the ND-500, several are reserved for use by the processor's microprogram.

Thus, in its selection of registers, the ND-500 processor more strongly resembles the ND-100 which, at each priority level, provides a single accumulator (A), index register (X), base register (B), extension register (D), program counter (P), link register (L), along with a temporary register (T) mostly used for floating-point operations, and a status register (STS). Unlike the ND-500, the ND-100 preserves the fixed-size, 16-bit instruction format of the earlier Nord-10 series, but like the ND-500, the ND-100 processor is microprogrammed.

Promotional materials for the ND-500 emphasised the "highly symmetric" or orthogonal instruction set, permitting the use of all addressing modes with all instruction types and with all data types, providing memory-to-memory instructions able to retrieve operands, perform computational operations, and store results. Such materials claimed a higher code density than most 16-bit computers despite the 32-bit nature of the ND-500 processor.

The ND-5000 architecture introduced various refinements, notably a four-stage pipeline, allowing the constituent parts of each microcode instruction, or "microinstruction", to be processed in turn by dedicated processing units in the pipeline. The four pipeline stages involve instruction fetching, operand fetching, ALU operations, and result writing. Thus, up to four microinstructions could be undergoing processing at once, potentially permitting an execution throughput of one microinstruction per machine cycle. Although the most frequently used machine instructions or "macroinstructions" were implemented by a single microinstruction at each pipeline stage, potentially delivering a throughput of one machine instruction per cycle, a number of factors could contribute to a lower throughput, notably cache misses for instructions, addresses and data, the use of indirect and indexed addressing, data alignment issues, and incorrect branch predictions. Cycles could be added or stretched to accommodate these complicating conditions.

The cache architecture of the ND-500 employed virtual addresses instead of physical addresses to allow cache lookup and address translation to occur in parallel, a strategy also employed by the PA-RISC architecture. The ND-500 architecture employed a "write-through" cache strategy, but a small, high-speed write buffer allowed the processor to proceed while the cache controller populated the cache and issued writes to memory.

The ND-5000 cache implementation differed from that of the ND-500, employing a "write-once" strategy that issued a memory write when first recording data to be stored in the cache for a particular location. Such an approach aimed to achieve the efficiency of a write-back strategy by largely avoiding main memory access. However, a write-back strategy with the virtually addressed cache was regarded as presenting difficulties should a write-back to memory occur at a later point in time and cause a page fault. The write-once approach avoided such complications by establishing an initial memory mapping and reserving it for eventual writes to memory. A write-through strategy could also be selected through a processor configuration register.

== Hardware implementations ==
In its first incarnation, the ND-500 was built using TTL integrated circuits, just as the Nord-50 had been. The floating-point processor featured in the ND-500 reportedly consisted of 579 integrated circuits and used a combinatorial approach to support the execution of 64-bit multiplication operations in 480 nanoseconds. Norsk Data claimed a Whetstone benchmark rating of 1.4 to 1.8 million single-precision Whetstone instructions per second for the ND-500.

The ND-500 architecture lived through four distinct implementations. Each implementation was sold under a variety of different model numbers.

ND also sold multiprocessor configurations, naming them ND-580/n and an ND-590n, where n represented the number of CPUs in a given configuration, 2, 3, or 4.

=== ND-500/1 ===
Sold as the ND-500, ND-520, ND-540, and ND-560.

=== ND-500/2 ===
Sold as the ND-570, ND-570/CX, and ND-570/ACX.

The ND-500/CX series upgraded the ND-500 range during 1984, introducing the ND-530/CX, ND-550/CX, ND-560/CX and ND-570/CX in a range of different product variants, including the compact model III for the lower-end products. Advertised performance figures were given as 0.6, 1.3, 2.1 and 3.3 million Whetstone instructions per second for the respective products. Pricing for the models was given as ranging from $215,000 for the ND-530/CX to $485,000 for the ND-570/CX, these prices also including 24 terminals and a printer. A basic ND-570/CXA configuration cost around $300,000 when announced in late 1983.

==== ND-505 ====
The ND-505/CX was a version of the ND-500 machine with an advertised 29-bit addressing capability. Pins were essentially snipped on the backplane, removing its status as a superminicomputer, and allowing it to legally pass the CoCom embargo in force at the time and be exported to the Eastern Bloc. Disputed claims were made in Computerworld's Norwegian edition that the ND-505 was, in fact, a machine capable of 31-bit addressing, with the segment size halved by cutting a connection corresponding to the top bit of the segment address.

Since the ND-500 architecture provides 32 segments per domain and has separate address spaces for instructions and data, usually employing a 27-bit segment size of 128 MB and yielding instruction and data areas each of 4 GB in size, a halved segment size of 64 MB would have yielded instruction and data areas each of 2 GB in size. However, the advertised sizes of these areas for the ND-505 was only 0.25 GB, suggesting 28-bit addressing and thus further restrictions on the number of signals provided for the segment address or for segment selection. Meanwhile, the size of the combined 28-bit instruction and data areas could, with some generosity, be regarded as being equivalent to a 29-bit address space in architectures that do not maintain such a separate addressing regime, at least for the purposes of advertising.

==== KPS-10 ====
The KPS-10 in the Knowledge Processing System range developed by Racal-Norsk, a joint venture with Racal Electronics, was based on the ND-570 model, featuring customised microcode to run ZetaLisp and other languages at potentially higher speeds than existing Lisp machines and Digital's VAX. Several of these systems were reportedly delivered to "universities in the UK and Scandinavia" in advance of a commercial launch scheduled for late 1985.

The KPS-10 employed framebuffers arranged as bit planes in dedicated graphics boards that were mapped into the memory of the system processor, permitting the processor to update the display by writing to the memory region exposed for each bit plane. Each graphics board contained one megabyte of memory divided into four bit planes whose data could be used to represent monochrome, greyscale and colour displays, with the latter involving a colour controller employing a colour lookup table and digital-to-analogue converters to generate colour signals. Pairs of framebuffers could be combined to provide double buffering. A display of 1180 x 1440 could reportedly be updated in "less than a microsecond". The memory architecture of the machine, featuring "an internal communications bus that requires more than 100 balanced line drivers and receivers to handle the address, data, and control lines" was described as ideal for transmitting graphical data to terminals at a distance of 100 metres from the computer itself, and the utilisation of several of the machine's ten memory banks permitted a theoretical limit of 36 bitmapped screens and a practical limit of 20 bitmapped screens.

A KPS-5 model based on the ND-550 was also announced but presumably never delivered. Racal and Norsk Data abandoned their joint venture in early 1986 claiming that the investment required to develop artificial intelligence systems was "not commercially justified at present".

=== Samson ===
Sold as the ND-5200, ND-5400, ND-5500, ND-5700, ND-5800 and ND-5900. The ND-120 CPU line, which constituted the ND-100 side of the three higher-end ND-5000 computers, was named Delilah. The ND-110 accompanied the three lower-end models. As the 500/5000 line progressed in speed, the dual-arch ND-100/500 configuration increasingly became bottlenecked by all input/output (I/O) having to go through the ND-100.

The ND-5700, ND-5800 and ND-5900 were introduced in 1987 as high-end models, employing "state-of-the-art CMOS gate array technology" to reduce the footprint of the CPU implementation, replacing the 24 circuit boards required in the previous ND-500 architecture models. The ND-5900 was a multi-CPU model featuring two, three or four CPUs. Performance varied between the models, with the ND-5700 delivering around half the performance of the ND-5800, and with the ND-5900 models respectively delivering two, three and four times the performance of the ND-5800. Pricing for the models started at $400,000 for the ND-5700, reaching $1.53 million for the four-CPU ND-5900.

Such relative performance measures translated to respective benchmark ratings of around 0.5, 1, 2, 3.5 and 6.5 million Whetstone instructions per second for the ND-5200, ND-5400, ND-5500, ND-5700 and ND-5800, largely similar to comparable models in the previous generation of machines, but adding enhanced performance at the top end of the range. (Note: A specific figure is missing for the ND-5800, but an approximate figure can be deduced from the relative performance claims in Norsk Data's September 1987 newsletter.) The performance differences are explained by the usage of three different CPU types: type 1, used by the ND-5200, omits cache memory and hardware floating-point support; type 2 introduces an instruction cache in the ND-5400, an additional data cache in the ND-5500, and an address cache in the ND-5700; type 3, used by the ND-5800, introduces all cache variants plus the write-once caching strategy.

Later models were introduced at the low end of the range in the form of the ND-5000 Compact series, aimed at small and medium-size companies and featuring a cabinet size with "modest dimensions", "occupying less than a square metre of floor space", and designed for a conventional office environment, as opposed to a dedicated machine room. Offered as the ND-5200 Compact, ND-5400 Compact, ND-5500 Compact and ND-5700 Compact, supporting smaller amounts of memory than the earlier ND-5000 models, performance of the high-end ND-5700 Compact was around that of the conventional ND-5700 model.

The Compact series generally offered a reported 0.5 to 3.5 million Whetstone instructions per second across the different models. Norsk Data claimed that this was "the world's largest compatible range" of computers, or perhaps the industry's range with broadest performance characteristics across compatible models, with the top-end ND-5900 Model 4 delivering a claimed 26 million Whetstone instructions per second. (Note: Note that Norsk Data uses the term "Mips" in its description of the Compact series, not explicitly referencing any industry-defined performance metric, leaving such figures open to interpretation. However, the 1986 annual report, published in 1987, indicates "26 Whetstone MIPS" for the cumulative performance rating of the four-CPU model.) These compact models generally offered the same performance as the tall or large models.

The ND-5900/4 featured in Norsk Data's proposal for the FUNN regional research and development network programme, initiated in 1987 after a proposal was made to the Norwegian government to establish publicly-funded regional computing centres. Described as Norsk Data's largest and newest machine, each unit of the specified configuration would be delivered running SINTRAN III and NDIX, the latter to satisfy a requirement for availability of a "standardised UNIX" for software portability and to minimise vendor lock-in, with these operating systems running in parallel on the hardware. The cost of each installed machine was almost 13 million NOK, equivalent to $1.51 million, and approximately 27 million NOK or $3.14 million today. The FUNN initiative itself was described as one of the last attempts to rescue Norsk Data, "a complete fiasco project leading to nothing", partly due to the delivered systems lacking relevant software and the necessary interoperability for a genuine multi-vendor solution.

In 1988, with the introduction of Norsk Data's Extended System Architecture, this being the company's open systems strategy, two models of the ND-5000 ES (Extended Server) product were unveiled: the low-end Model S as an "affordable supermini in micro format", and the more powerful Model C as a departmental server based on the "ND-5800 SE processor... yielding up to twice the previous CPU performance". The full range featured full-size Model L variants of the different product configurations, these being the ND-5200 ES, ND-5400 ES, ND-5500 ES, ND-5700 ES, ND-5800 ES and ND-5900 ES, with the compact Model C variant covering all but the high-end ND-5900 ES, and the satellite Model S variants covering only the ND-5200 ES and ND-5400 ES.

=== Rallar ===
Sold as the ND-5830 and ND-5850. The Rallar processor consisted of two main VLSI gate arrays, KUSK (En: Jockey) and GAMP (En: Horse).

By 1990, the ND-5000 ES range had been condensed to feature only the ND-5700 ES, ND-5830 ES and ND-5850 ES in the three profile variants, these offering a claimed performance of 9.5, 16.8 and 30.4 million single-precision Whetstone instructions per second respectively. The ND-5950 ES, available in the Model L variant and utilising the same processor as the ND-5850 ES, could have two, three or four processors, maintaining a similar arrangement to that of the previous ND-5900 models in their range. Model S pricing ranged from 590,000 to 1.59 million NOK ($67,000 to $181,000), Model C pricing from 890,000 to 1.99 million NOK ($100,000 to $226,000), and Model L pricing from 1.19 million to 4.99 million NOK ($135,000 to $567,000).

Alongside these newer ND-5000-based models, the company also introduced the ND-5100/xi system. Despite adherence to the existing naming convention, this was actually a system based on the Intel 80386 running SCO Xenix System V, offered in 14 different configurations. This inconsistent branding persisted with the incorporation of the ND-5000 technology into Norsk Data's Uniline range, consisting of three models based on the Intel 80386 having the Uniline 10, 20 and 40 designations, alongside the Uniline 35, 45 and 55 models based on the ND-5000.

From 1990, upgrades were offered for ND-5000 models having the Uniline or ND-5000 ES designation to deliver an upgraded system with Uniline 88/20C specifications, thus becoming a system based on the Motorola 88000 architecture running a Unix implementation provided by UniSoft. Apart from the low-end Uniline 88/17Jr model based on the Data General Aviion 3200 which ran DG/UX, the Uniline 88 range was developed by the Norsk Data spin-off, Dolphin Server Technology. Evidently, some ND-5000 series customers elected to upgrade to entirely new Uniline 88 models to eliminate the high maintenance costs of the older machines, also benefiting from the improved performance.

== Software ==
Norsk Data provided a range of software for the ND-500 and ND-5000, mostly for systems running SINTRAN III. Its office support tools were centred on the NOTIS productivity suite, and its database products were centred on the SIBAS database management system. Other data processing software included a variety of application development tools including ACCESS and UNIQUE that, along with SIBAS, formed part of the company's DIALOGUE information systems concept. Various tools were provided to support software development, including the PED source-code editor and file comparison programs. Programming language support included implementations of Ada, APL, BASIC, COBOL, Fortran, Pascal, and Simula, alongside Norsk Data's own PLANC systems programming language. Other tools covered terminal emulation and communications needs. The company's NORTEXT solution for newspaper publishing supported the ND-500/5000 only in certain components.

LED was a programmer's source-code editor by Norsk Data running on the ND-500 computers running Sintran III. It featured automatic indenting, pretty-printing of source code, and integration with the compiler environment. It was sold as an advanced alternative to PED.

In 1984, Norsk Data contracted Logica to undertake a project to port Berkeley Software Distribution (BSD) 4.2 Unix to the ND-500/CX, this being described as Logica's first attempt to port BSD 4.2 despite "extensive experience with Microsoft's Xenix". The purpose of this effort was so that ND could sell the 500 to the European Organization for Nuclear Research (CERN), since CERN along with other technical and scientific users had been buying VAXes from Digital Equipment Corporation, and CERN's accelerators and experiments had begun to standardise on multi-vendor technologies such as Unix. Initial deliveries of the work were made to CERN during the 1986 financial year. Luleå University College in Northern Sweden, an established development partner of Norsk Data, provided a C compiler for this work.

In this Unix implementation, released as NDIX, the kernel and its processes ran on the ND-500 processor, with the ND-100 processor acting as the system's input/output handler. The code and data segments of each user process were demand paged in units of 2 KB, and Norsk Data claimed that the implementation was "optimized to take full advantage of the ND-500 architecture". A second-generation ND-500 system and a minimum of 4 MB of RAM in the ND-500 and 2 MB in the ND-100 were required to run NDIX. SINTRAN would still run on the ND-100, and it was possible to schedule SINTRAN processes on the ND-500 alongside NDIX processes. As a consequence of the system architecture, all I/O had to go through the ND-100 which proved very inefficient. For example, running vi on the ND-500 brought the ND-100 to its knees.

The ND-500 struggled to meet CERN's goals as a Unix system, with NDIX described as "not being entirely satisfactory" after more than two years of slow progress on the implementation. More enthusiastic commentary acknowledged the ND-500's "problems with I/O performance" under NDIX, along with fundamental architectural limitations of ND-500 systems, but claimed that "now (on a ND-570) it is generally better than a VAX-785 whilst its processing performance is far superior". Nevertheless, further adoption of Norsk Data machines was noted as being contingent on the company recognising the architectural limitations of the ND-500 and continuing to collaborate with CERN on enhancements. Norsk Data was, however, perceived as favouring its own proprietary operating system over NDIX.

With the launch of the ND-5000 Compact models in 1987, Norsk Data promised the later availability of a POSIX-compliant Unix system running concurrently with Sintran on the main ND-5000 processor, as opposed to running within Sintran, persisting with the use of Sintran on the front-end ND-100 series processor.

The EXPERT compiler suite from ACE Associated Computer Experts, providing language compilation support for C, Fortran-77, Modula-2, Pascal and COBOL, supported the ND-5000 as a target architecture.

== Reception ==
In 1985, the ND-500 accounted for around 70% of Norsk Data's revenue, and the company remained upbeat about the competitive threat from Digital, who in 1986 had become the fastest growing minicomputer vendor in Norway. Fundamentally, despite a claimed performance advantage of 60–70% over a VAX system, the ND-500 could not compete with the superior VAX I/O architecture, initially supporting only a single user at a time using ND's own software environment, stretching to up to five concurrent users under pressure from customers. Only eventually could some ND-500 installations support up to 40 concurrent users.

Given the established usage of Norsk Data computers at CERN, some adoption of the ND-500 did occur, such as in the organisation's PS division where a ND-570 model was used for program development and use of the ND-NOTIS suite. However, by 1987, VAX systems had emerged as a "de facto" standard in particle physics experiments, having been adopted by CERN's LEP collaborations, leaving opportunities for Norsk Data largely confined to "extensions, upgrades and replacements" within various existing control systems. By 1989, CERN's experiments were using over 100 VAX and MicroVAX computers, and of the 20 or more Norsk Data computers in use, six were ND-500 series models. The organisation's accelerator divisions employed around 110 ND-100 series models, with the PS and SPS divisions each having two ND-570 systems. However, about 100 IBM PC/AT systems were also being used, alongside an increasing number of workstations. Across the whole of CERN, over 120 Apollo workstations and over 250 VAXstations had been taken into use.

The claimed 7 million Whetstone instructions per second (MWIPS) for the ND-5800, (Note: Crutcher confuses the earlier ND-570 and later ND-5800 when referencing Norsk Data's performance claims.) compared with independent measurements for the VAX-11/785 of around 1.65 MWIPS, may have given some legitimacy to claims of "far superior" computational performance. However, VAX configurations were available with other floating-point accelerators, such as those from Floating Point Systems, even directly from Digital. Floating Point Systems had itself introduced systems that combined Sun-3 and VAXstation II workstations with its own products. In the absence of a planned "desktop minisupercomputer" from Norsk Data and Matra Datasysteme, Matra itself offered Floating Point Systems accelerators in combination with the ND-500. By 1986, Digital's VAX-11/785 had already been superseded by the VAX 8600, indicated by Norsk Data as a key competitor to the ND-570, and offering performance of over 4 MWIPS with floating-point accelerator, increasing to almost 7 MWIPS in the VAX 8650 of 1985.

The introduction of RISC-based systems further changed purchasing considerations. Even an individual RISC workstation could deliver comparable performance at a fraction of the cost of a ND-500 or ND-5000 series machine, such as the DECstation 3100 delivering 13 MWIPS for around $12,000, outperforming most of Norsk Data's single-processor models from its 1988 line-up in the primary metric chosen to promote their performance. Even against the 1990 line-up, with Norsk Data having introduced the ND-5830 and ND-5850 processors with significantly faster floating-point performance in server products, existing products such as the DECsystem 5400 could, for around £42,000 (or $57,534), offer comparable floating-point performance to all but the high-end ND-5850 systems, coupled with ostensibly superior performance in other regards, compared to ND-5830 pricing starting at 1.09 million NOK (or $126,892). 1990 would see the introduction of IBM's RS/6000 systems, such as the £78,500 (or $107,534) Model 540, whose computational performance would largely surpass the entire Norsk Data single-processor ND-5000 range, undercutting top-end ND-5850 models priced upwards of 1.59 million NOK (or $181,000).

By 1990, it had become apparent that the ND-100 series machines still in use in CERN's SPS control system, numbering over 50 units, were faced with "technical obsolescence" and prohibitive maintenance costs. Their proprietary operating system and network technology inhibited the use of "modern software packages and communication standards", leading to a "necessary and urgent" need to consolidate the affected control systems with those of the LEP, the LEP control system architecture being largely based on personal computers running Xenix and workstations running Unix. Ultimately, the ND-100 series machines were replaced with a combination of Unix systems and X terminals for control room functionality and systems running LynxOS for process control functionality. Despite the removal of the Norsk Data systems, facilities were developed and retained to execute programs written in NODAL in an emulated environment, thus preserving "the enormous investment in application programs" and corresponding programming environment, and allowing the control console user interface to be replicated in the new environment within a reasonable timeframe. NODAL was an interpreted language "based on FOCAL and SNOBOL4, with influence from BASIC".

ND-5000 models incorporated the Motorola 68020 as input/output controllers, and an interfacing concept known as DOMINO was able to provide the ND-5000 range with VMEbus connectivity. This enabled interoperability with existing hardware architectures used in domains such as particle physics. Utilisation of the "powerful 68020 processor" gave the ND-5000's system bus a bandwidth of 18 MB per second and enabled its use as a front-end system for the CESAR systolic array processor, designed to process synthetic-aperture radar data. The control processor for the CESAR system had previously employed the Motorola 68000, with a ND-100 minicomputer acting as the host computer or front-end system. Due to the system architecture of the ND-5000, the later CESAR system architecture also featured a ND-120 minicomputer acting as the input/output front-end for lower-performance devices. Later versions of CESAR employed different front-end systems: an Apollo DN10000 workstation, a Silicon Graphics workstation, and then a SPARC-based system.

Somewhat as a consequence of CERN's adoption of the Nord-10 for the SPS, the model was introduced within the EISCAT project, and in 1986, all Nord-10 systems were upgraded to the ND-530/CX with 2.5 MB of memory. A ND-5400 machine was subsequently installed in 1990. In 1984, Rutherford Appleton Laboratory took into use a ND-560/CX model for data processing related to the project, this system employing customised "array processing microcode" for additional performance.

Another specialised application of the ND-5000 models involved a "molecular design system" known as the Proteus BioEngine, developed by British company Proteus Biotechnology, which included ND-5900 hardware. Norsk Data's product was reportedly chosen for the ability to more easily customise the processor microcode than with products such as those in Digital's VAX range.
