= Funn =

Funn may refer to:

== People ==
- Samuel Joseph Fünn (1819–1891), Hebrew writer and scholar
- Will Funn (born 1982), American former professional basketball player
- Mel Funn, a character in 1976 American satirical comedy film Silent Movie

== Other uses ==
- Research and Development Network in Norway (Forsknings og utviklingsnett i Norge, FUNN), a former network of computing centers in Norway

== See also ==
- Fun (disambiguation)
