= Sintran =

- Developer: Norsk Data, Norwegian Institute of Technology, SINTEF
- Written in: Fortran
- Working state: Discontinued
- Source model: Closed-source
- Initial release: 1968; 58 years ago
- Final release: Final / 1992; 34 years ago
- Available in: English
- Update method: Compile from source code
- Supported platforms: Norsk Data minicomputers, Nord-1 terminal servers
- Kernel type: Monolithic
- Default user interface: Command-line
- License: Proprietary
- Succeeded by: Sintran II, Sintran III

Sintran (a portmanteau of SINTEF and Fortran; stylized as SINTRAN) is a range of operating systems (OS) for Norsk Data's line of minicomputers. The original version, released in 1968, was an online operating system developed in cooperation with SINTEF's Department of Engineering Cybernetics. The different incarnations of the OS shared only a name, and to a degree, purpose.

Norsk Data took part in developing Sintran II, a multi-user software system that constituted the software platform for the Nord-1 range of terminal servers. By far the most common version of the OS was Sintran III, developed solely by Norsk Data and launched in 1974. This real-time multitasking system was used for Norsk Data's server machines (such as the Nord-10, -100) for the remainder of the company's lifetime, i.e. until 1992.

== See also ==
- Sintran III
