= Rolf Skår =

Norwegian engineer (1941–2023)

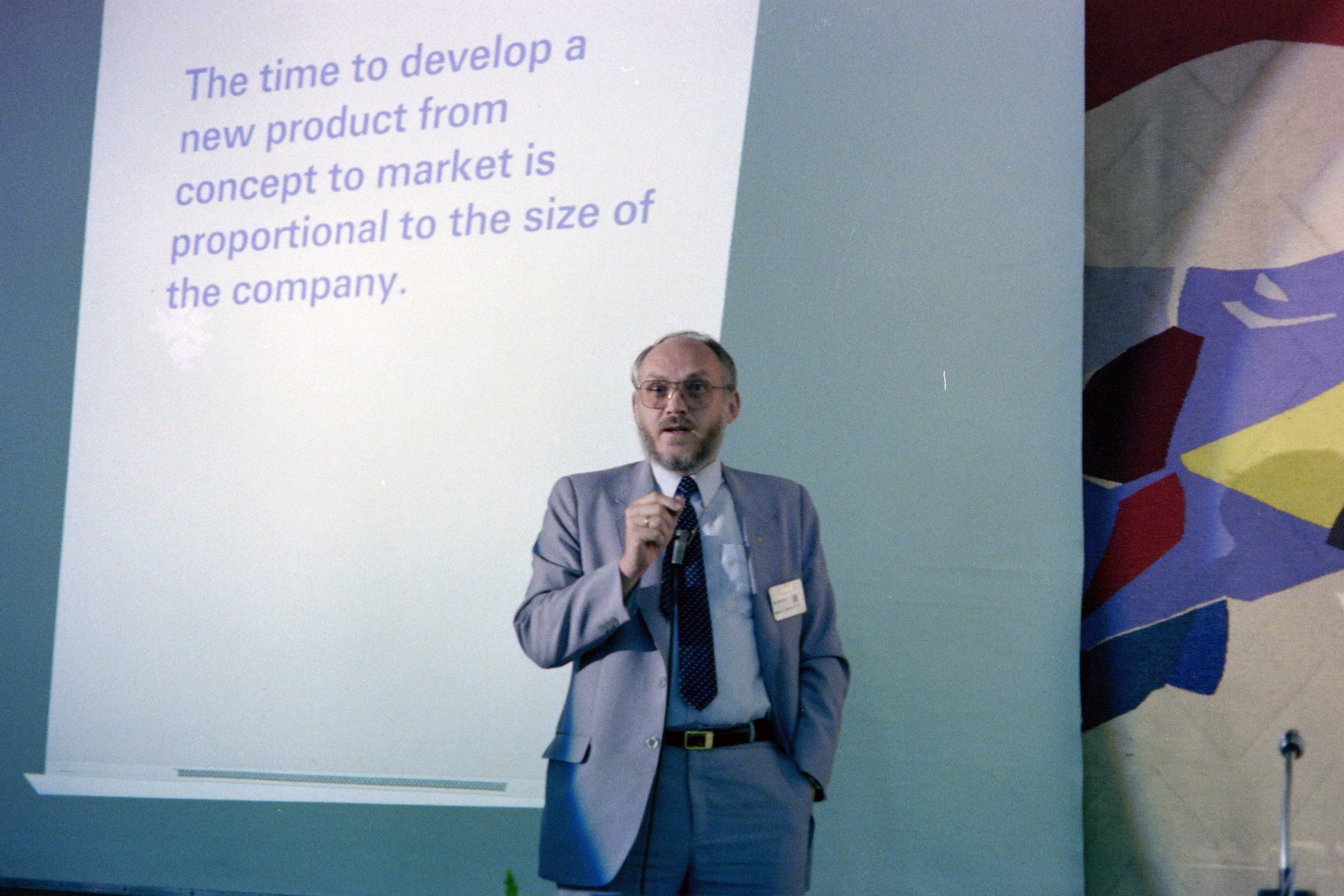
- 1985 St. Gallen University Archives
- Born: 13 May 1941; Karmøy, Reichskommissariat Norwegen (today Norway)
- Died: 24 May 2023 (aged 82)
- Education: Norwegian Institute of Technology (degree in cybernetics)
- Occupation: Engineer
- Known for: Co-founder and CEO of Norsk Data; Chairman of the Norwegian Polytechnic Society; CEO of the Norwegian Space Centre
- Spouse: Aslaug Signy Nisi
- Awards: Order of St. Olav (2010)

Rolf Skår (13 May 1941 – 24 May 2023) was a Norwegian engineer and entrepreneur. He was a co-founder of the computer manufacturing company Norsk Data in 1967, and took over as chief executive officer (CEO) of the company from 1978 to 1989. He was later CEO of the Royal Norwegian Council for Scientific and Industrial Research, chaired the Norwegian Polytechnic Society, and was CEO of the Norwegian Space Centre from 1998 to 2006. For his contributions to information technology and space activity, Skår was knighted as in the First Class of the Order of St. Olav in 2010.

== Early life and education ==
Born on the island of Karmøy on 13 May 1941, Skår was the son of farmer and fisherman Lars Martin Skår and Magnhild Ytreland. In 1966, Skår graduated in cybernetics from the Norwegian Institute of Technology where he studied under Professor Jens Glad Balchen. During his studies he had several periods abroad. In the summer of 1963 he went to Switzerland to work for an electrical products manufacturer. The following year he took part in the CERN Summer Student Programme working with digital technology and during the summer 1965 he worked for NATO Saclant in La Spezia, Italy. His diploma involved software development on the minicomputer SAM at the Norwegian Defence Research Establishment, while serving his mandatory military duty there. After the military duty, he was assigned as researcher at the institute, working on the institute's next computer project called SAM-2.

== Norsk Data ==
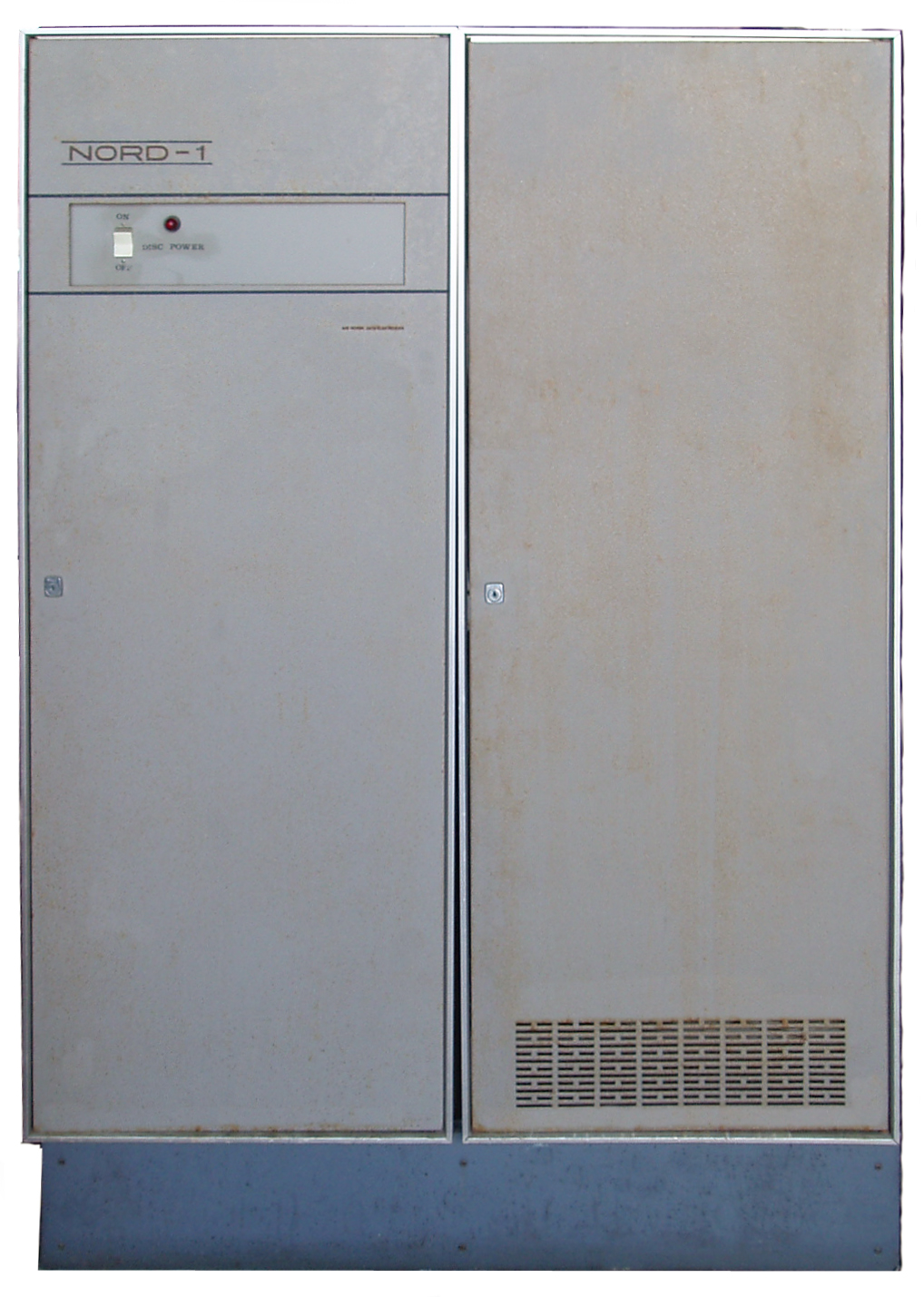
The Nord-1 was Norsk Data's first minicomputer model.

Skår was a co-founder of the computer manufacturing company Norsk Data in 1967, along with Lars Monrad-Krohn, the first director, and Per Bjørge. Skår was CEO of the company from 1978 to 1989. Prior to becoming CEO, he had assumed various positions in the company, both in software development and in sales and marketing. During this period Norsk Data grew to become one of the largest computer manufacturers in Europe, followed by a steep decline due to competition from Unix servers and PC networks. Skår resigned from his position in 1989, and Norsk Data was dissolved in 1992.

== Later career ==
From 1990 to 1992, Skår was CEO of the Royal Norwegian Council for Scientific and Industrial Research, and he was CEO of Norconsult from 1993 to 1997. From 1993 to 1995 he also chaired the Norwegian Polytechnic Society. He was CEO of the Norwegian Space Centre from 1998 to 2006, thus taking a leading part in the development of the Svalbard Satellite Station, as well as in bringing modern telecommunication to Svalbard by establishing fiber cables between Svalbard and mainland Norway, the Svalbard Undersea Cable System. He also represented Norway in the European Space Agency.

== Recognition ==
Skår was a fellow of the Norwegian Academy of Technological Sciences, the Royal Swedish Academy of Engineering Sciences, and the International Academy of Aeronautics. He was decorated Knight, First Class of the Order of St. Olav in 2010, for his contributions to information technology and space activity.

== Personal life ==
Skår married Aslaug Signy Nisi, a librarian and preschool teacher, in 1965.

He died on 24 May 2023, at age 82.

Non-profit organization positions
Preceded by Egil Bakke	Chairman of the Norwegian Polytechnic Society; 1993–1995	Succeeded by Frøydis Langmark
