= Lars Monrad-Krohn =

Norwegian engineer and entrepreneur (born 1933)

Lars Monrad-Krohn (born July 14, 1933) is a Norwegian engineer and entrepreneur.

He graduated from the Norwegian Institute of Technology, Institute for Radio Technology, (NTH, Institutt for Radioteknikk) in 1959. His master's thesis addressed construction of computer core memory and was the first computer-oriented thesis handed in at NTH. As an entrepreneur, Monrad-Krohn established Norsk Data AS in 1967 (CEO 1967-1972), A/S Mycron in 1975 (CEO 1975-1982), and Tiki-Data in 1984 (CEO 1984-1996). He also founded NCNOR in 1997, acquiring distribution rights to the Acorn NetStation in Norway. Up to and including the autumn 2008 semester, he taught entrepreneurship at the Department of Informatics, University of Oslo.

He is a fellow of the Norwegian Academy of Technological Sciences.
