= Royal Norwegian Council for Scientific and Industrial Research =

Former research council in Norway operating between 1946 and 1992

The Royal Norwegian Council for Scientific and Industrial Research (Norwegian: Norges Teknisk-Naturvitenskapelige Forskningsråd) or NTNF was the first of five research councils established in Norway. It existed from 1946 until the end of 1992, when the five merged to create Research Council of Norway. The council was partially independent, but was ultimately subordinate to the Ministry of Trade and Industry.

Chairmen were Alf Ihlen (1946–1952), Carl Høegh (1960–1964), Erik Anker (–1973), Kåre Torp (1973–), The managing directors were Robert Major (1946–1981), and Rolf Skår (1990–1992).
