= Nord-1 =

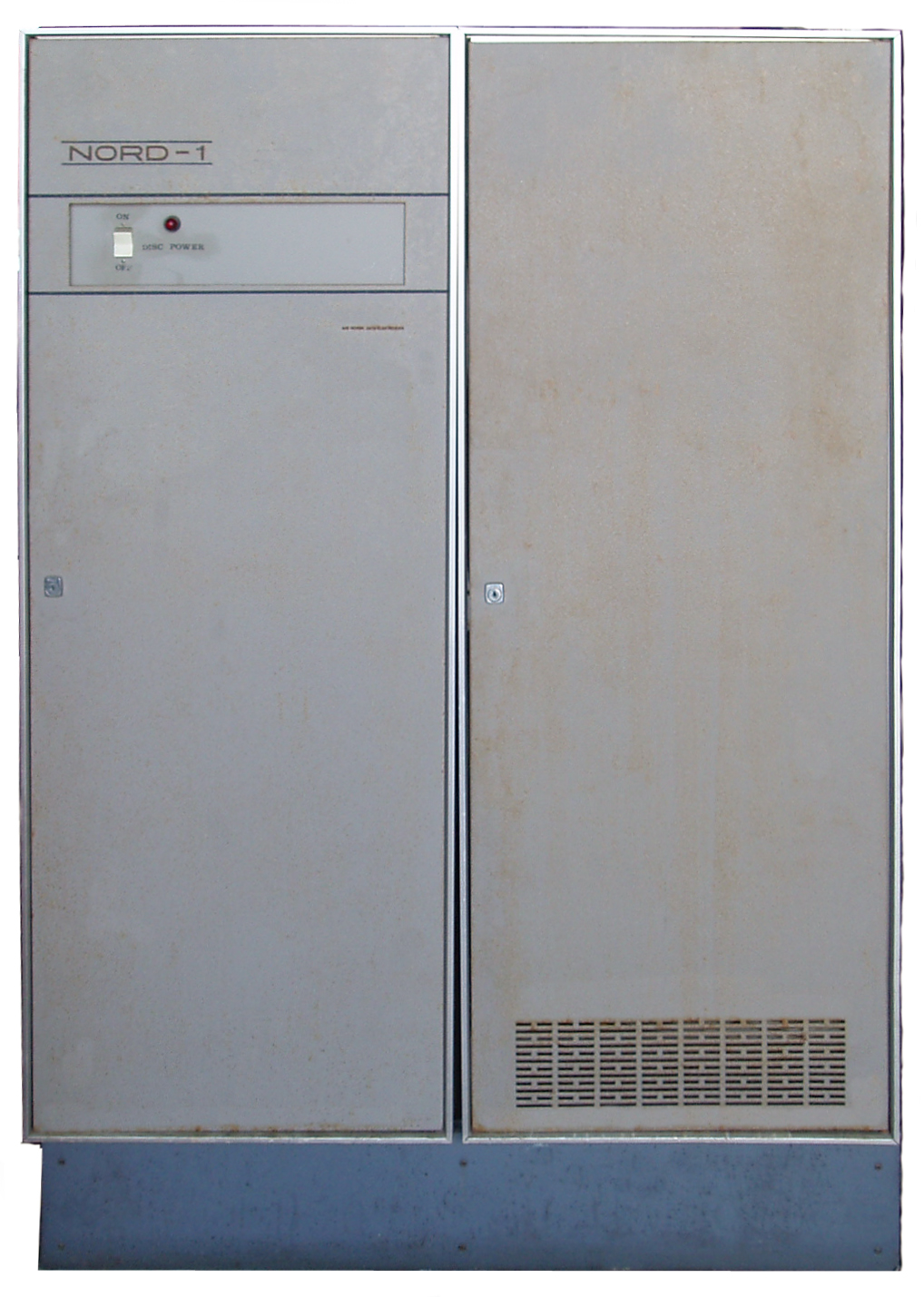
- The Nord-1
- Developer: Norsk Data
- Manufacturer: Norsk Data
- Product family: Nord
- Type: Minicomputer
- Generation: 2
- Released: 1967; 59 years ago
- Lifespan: 1967–1972
- Discontinued: 1973; 53 years ago
- Units sold: 60
- Units shipped: 60
- Operating system: Sintran I
- CPU: 16-bit
- Camera: none
- Touchpad: none
- Predecessor: Simulation for Automatic Machinery (SAM)
- Successor: Nord-10

Nord-1 was Norsk Data's first minicomputer and the first commercially available computer made in Norway.

It was a 16-bit system, developed in 1967 from the Simulation for Automatic Machinery. The first Nord-1 (serial number 2) installed was at the heart of a complete ship system aboard a Japanese-built cargo liner, the Taimyr. The system included bridge control, power management, load condition monitoring, and the first ever computer-controlled, radar-sensed anti-collision system (Automatic Radar Plotting Aid). Taimyr's Nord-1 turned out reliable for the time, with more than a year between failures.

It was probably the first minicomputer to feature floating-point arithmetic equipment as standard, and had an unusually rich complement of hardware registers for its time. It also featured relative addressing, and a fully automatic context switched interrupt system. It was also the first minicomputer to offer virtual memory, offered as an option by 1969. It was succeeded by the Nord-10.

== Remaining machines ==
The Nord-1 has been unusually well-preserved. Approximately 60 machines seem to have been produced, and at the very least ten machines have been preserved, including serial numbers 2, 4, and 5. This may be because the company Norsk Data was already a very large and very rapidly growing corporation by the time many of these machines were decommissioned.
