= Sintran III =

Real-time operating system

- Developer: Norsk Data
- Written in: Nord Programming Language
- Working state: Discontinued
- Source model: Closed-source
- Initial release: 1974; 51 years ago
- Final release: Final / 1992; 33 years ago
- Available in: English
- Update method: Compile from source code
- Supported platforms: Norsk Data minicomputers
- Kernel type: Monolithic real-time
- Default user interface: Command-line
- License: Proprietary
- Preceded by: Sintran I, Sintran II

Sintran III is a real-time, multitasking, multi-user operating system used with Norsk Data minicomputers from 1974. Unlike its predecessors Sintran I and II, it was written entirely by Norsk Data, in Nord Programming Language (Nord PL, NPL), an intermediate language for Norsk Data computers.

== History ==
Sintran III emerged in pre-release form during 1974 and 1975 as a successor to the two distinct operating systems offered for the Nord-1 and Nord-10 computers: Sintran II for real-time systems and TSS for timesharing systems. Sintran III was intended to be a "multi-mode" system that could provide both kinds of the fundamental capabilities of its predecessors. Following a number of "usable releases" in 1976 and 1977, also categorised as pre-releases, Norsk Data provided official releases from 1978 onwards.

== Overview ==
Sintran was mainly a command-line interface based operating system, though there were several shells which could be installed to control the user environment more strictly, by far the most popular of which was USER-ENVIRONMENT.

One of the clever features was to be able to abbreviate commands and file names between hyphens. For example, typing LIST-FILES would give users several prompts, including for print, paging etc. Users could override this using the following LI-FI ,,n, which would abbreviate the LIST-FILES command prompt and bypass any of the prompts. One could also refer to files in this way, for example, with PED H-W: which would refer to HELLO-WORLD:SYMB if this was the only file having H, any number of characters, a hyphen -, a W, any number of characters, and any file ending.

This saved many keystrokes and would allow users a very nice learning experience, from complete and self-explanatory commands like LIST-ALL-FILES to L-A-F for an advanced user. (The hyphen key on Norwegian keyboards resides where the slash key does on U.S. ones.)

Now that Sintran has mostly disappeared as an operating system, there are few references to it. However a job control or batch processing language was available named JEC, believed to be named Job Execution Controller, this could be used to set up batch jobs to compile COBOL programs, etc.
