= History of Norsk Data =

Corporate logo from 1976 to 1992

Norsk Data (ND) was a Norwegian manufacturer of minicomputers which operated between 1967 and 1992. The company was established as A/S Nordata – Norsk Data-Elektronikk on 7 July 1967 and took into use the Norsk Data brand in 1975. The company was founded by Lars Monrad-Krohn, Rolf Skår and Per Bjørge, three computer engineers working at the Norwegian Defence Research Establishment which had just built the minicomputer SAM 2. ND's first contract was the delivery of a Nord-1 computer to Norcontrol. Initially in competition with Kongsberg, ND started delivering computers to Norwegian institutions. By 1972 the company had developed Sintran operating system, the 32-bit Nord-5 and a time sharing system.

The international break-through came with the 1973 delivery of computers to CERN and the company soon had half their sales abroad. Two years later the database program SIBAS had been completely ported and made available, and the following year a 150-terminal system connected via X.21/X.25 based XMSG and a flight simulator backbone for the F-16 were delivered. In 1978 Norsk Data both bought Tandberg and launched its office suite Notis, although Tandberg was sold again in 1980. ND became the first foreign-listed Norwegian company in 1981, which also saw the launch of the 32-bit ND-500. Throughout the 1980s ND acquired a series of domestic and foreign hardware and software companies, many loosely oriented at increased hardware sales. At the peak in 1986 and 1987, Norsk Data had 4,500 employees, 2.5 billion Norwegian krone (NOK) in revenue and was Norway's second-largest company by market capitalization—having increased fifty-fold between 1977 and 1985.

Despite late attempts to develop Ndix, ND never succeeded at entering the Unix market which started to dominate in the late 1980s. The company's share value halved on 19 October 1987 and never recovered. The company went through a series of reorganizations, but the company never succeeded at making money on open systems and the last area with profits was sales to existing Sintran customers. From 1988 the company was gradually split up; parts were sold to foreign competitors while others were spun off as subsidiaries or sold. By 1993 all equity had been lost and the remaining parts of the company sold off or taken over by the creditors. The main parts of company were bought by Telenor.

== Establishment ==
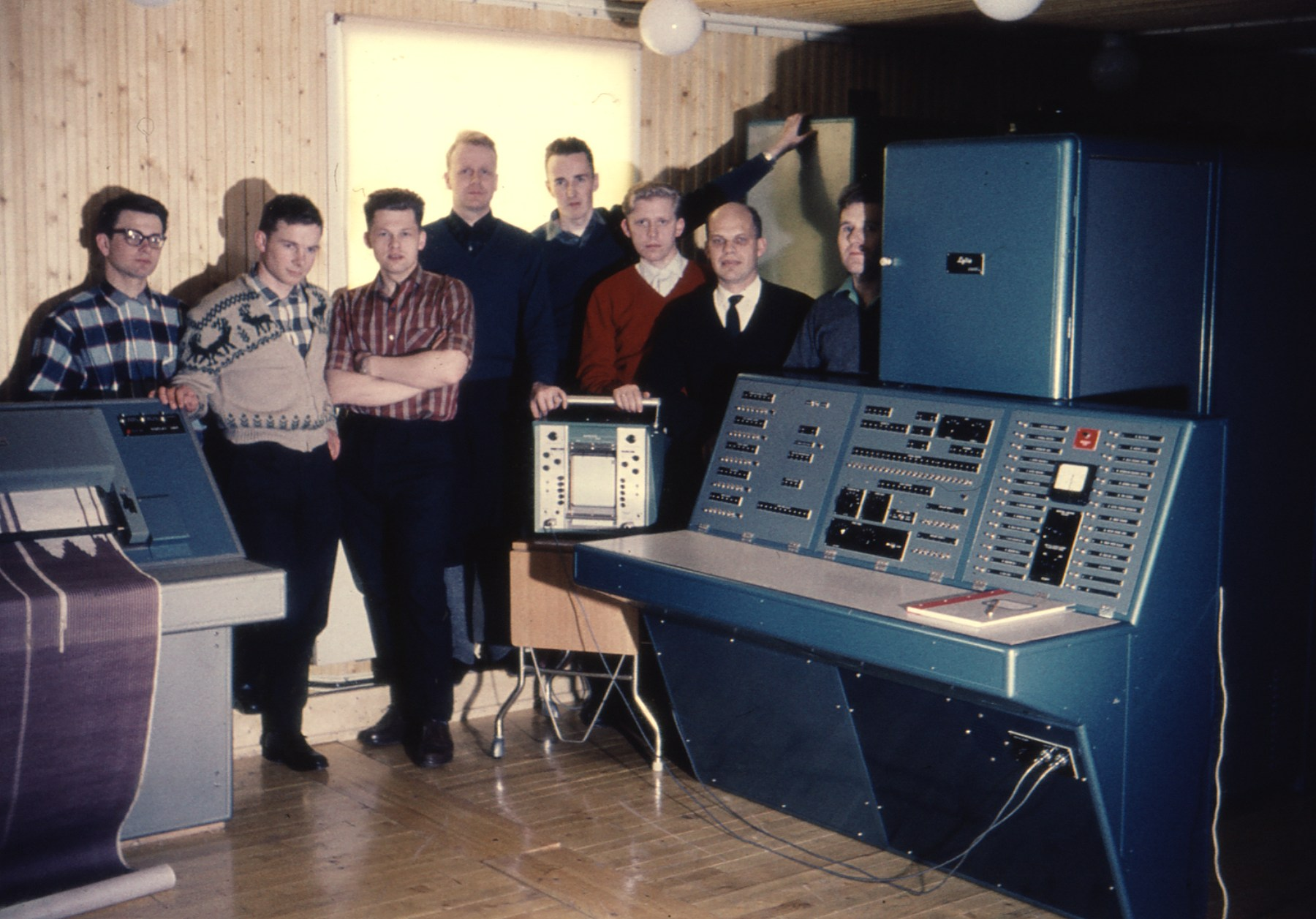
Per Bugge-Asperheim, Svein Strøm, Per Klevan, Lars Monrad-Krohn, Per Bjørge, Asbjørn Horn, Olav Landsverk and Yngvar Lundh which made up the NDRE's digital division in 1962

Norsk Data grew out of the development Simulation for Automatic Machinery 2 (SAM 2), a minicomputer developed at the Norwegian Defence Research Establishment (NDRE). The computer was ordered in 1966 for analysis of satellite data at Tromsø Satellite Station (TSS) and was the third computer built by NDRE. The main developers of the system were Rolf Skår, Per Bjørge, Lars Monrad-Krohn and Yngvar Lundh. SAM 2 was the first in Europe and among the first three in the world which used integrated circuits. The project was risky, as TSS originally had proposed buying an American computer and NDRE would have to buy such a computer if SAM 2 failed.

As there was time between SAM 2 was completed and it had to be in Tromsø, the designers took it on a tour to Bergen and Trondheim. While in Bergen the group met an old fellow student, Ivar Aanderaa, who was working as an entrepreneur. He inspired the others of the joys of being self-employed and a discussion went on all night on the 23 April 1967 about starting up a computer-manufacturing company. Based on that they had a technological edge and believed to have good timing, a decision to start a company was made.

For the entrepreneurs the main challenge was that their newly created computer was the property of the NDRE, which again had a strategic cooperation with Kongsberg, both government-owned. They expressed interest in the technology and considered themselves putting it into production. The other company which showed interest for the technology was the Horten-based Norcontrol, which was working on a project for ship automation but needed a computer to run the system. To raise capital, Skår took contact with his former college-mate Terje Mikalsen, who was working at Norcontrol. Mikalsen had married into a ship-owning family and was thus able to provide capital the others could not.

At this time NDRE was working with Kongsberg for plans to build a computer for a field artillery system. Monrad-Krohn proposed that their company should try to get this contract, but after it was awarded to NDRE, they had increased difficulty finding investors. The company had estimated a need for NOK 600,000. A founding meeting was held on 7 July 1967 with fifteen people present. The largest investor was Mosvold Shipping Group which invested NOK 100,000, while remaining investors put in NOK 94,000. The company was established as A/S Nordata – Norsk Data-Elektronikk. As "Nordata" was already registered by a company in Trondheim, the name was changed to A/S Norsk Data-Elektronikk on 20 July. The name would change again somewhat later in 1977 to the more concise and recognisable Norsk Data, this being more accessible to the company's increasingly international audience.

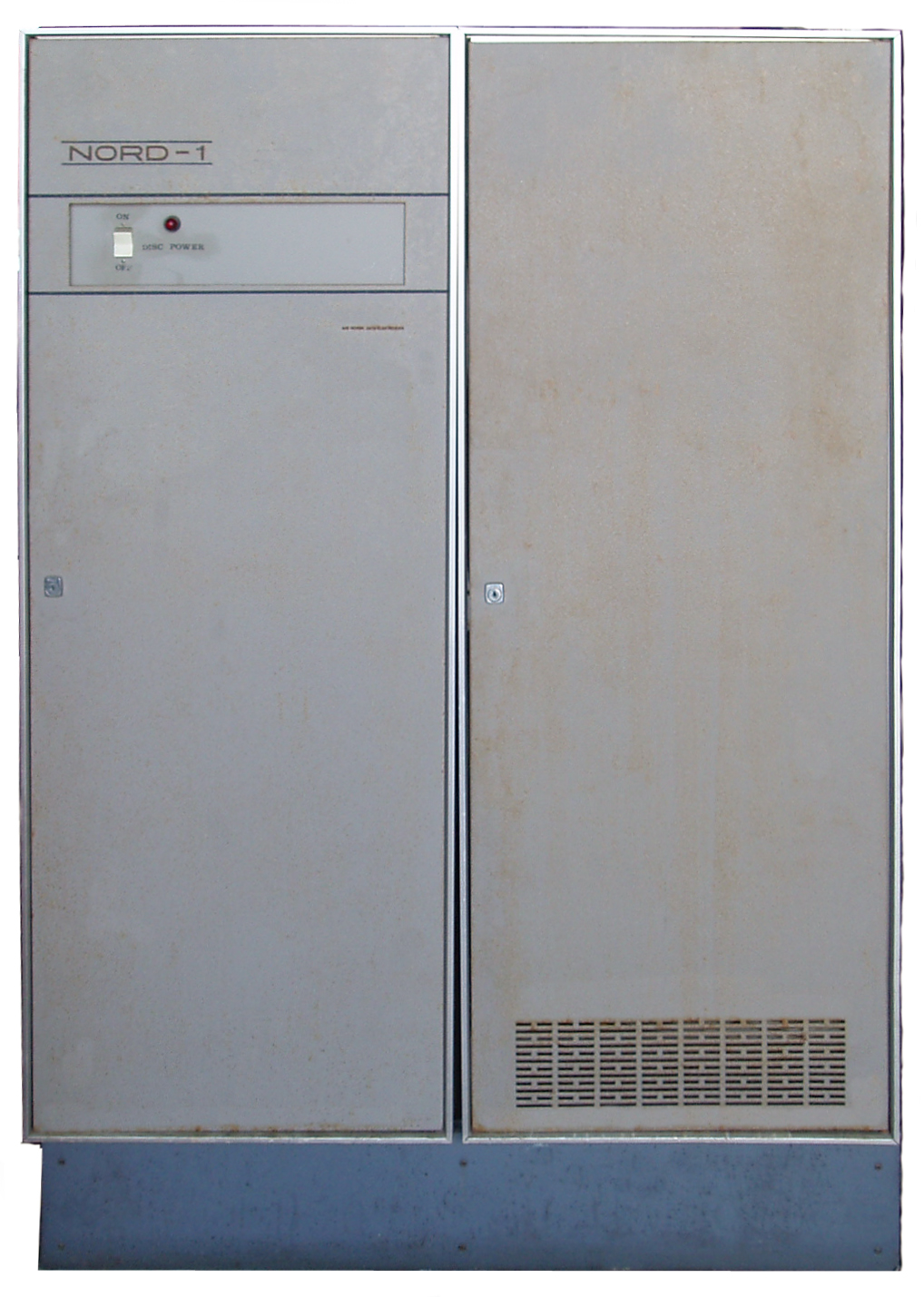
A Nord-1 minicomputer

The company's first offices were located at Ole Deviks vei 10 in Oslo, which was located in the facilities of a fan manufacturer. Operations commenced on 19 September with the three founders, Monrad-Krohn, Skår and Bjørge. They received the same wages as they had at NDRE. None of the entrepreneurs had any education or experience in business and operations started without a budget. The company's culture was inherited from NDRE—technology-oriented with focus on creativity and challenges. The first other employee was Tove Pedersen; she had an interview with the fan company, but had instead met up at ND. Monrad-Krohn did not let her inn on the error and instead carried out an interview and offered her a job, which she accepted.

== Nord-1 ==
Bjørge was responsible for hardware, Skår for software and Konrad-Mohn for sales. The company's first computer was Nord-1, which was a further development of SAM 2. It offered 0.5 million instructions per second (MIPS) and would sell for a few hundred thousand krone. To secure a bank guarantee for the first loan, life insurance was taken out on the three founders, with the beneficiary going to the bank. The development work started while the trio were working at NDRE, which was cooperating with the Institute for Energy Technology and Kongsberg. Preliminary work was therefore sent to both organizations to allow them to build computers.

A strategic cooperation with Norcontrol started in November 1967, when Norsk Data bought shares for NOK 200,000 in Norcontrol, which again bought shares for NOK 70,000 in Norsk Data. Norcontrol placed the first order for a Norsk Data computer on 26 January 1968. Shortly afterwards computers were ordered by the Central Institute for Industrial Research and the Chr. Michelsen Institute. Norsk Data and Kongsberg signed a market sharing agreement on 23 April 1968, in which Kongsberg would deliver computers to the military industry while Norsk Data would deliver to the civilian sector. In the early years, Kongsberg would continue to be Norsk Data's main competitor as the only other Norwegian manufacturer of minicomputers. Additional Norsk Data shares were issued in May 1968, bringing the share capital to NOK 894,000. New investors included Norsk Elektrisk & Brown Boveri (NEBB), Habberstad and Tharald Brøvig Jr.

The first Nord-1 was inaugurated on 21 May 1968 and sent to the Norwegian Institute of Technology (NTH) to have instruments installed. It spent a year in Trondheim and was constantly needing repairs. However, once it was not constantly being tweaked by engineers it operated for eighteen months without any failures. The Nord-1 was installed on MS Taimyr—a newly constructed Wilh. Wilhelmsen freight vessel—on 16 June 1969. This was the world's first such on-ship computer, which both featured an automatic radar plotting aid and an automated machine room. By 1973, Norsk Data had delivered 105 units to Norcontrol.

Ibb Høivold, Norcontrol's chief executive officer (CEO), was appointed chairman of the board in June 1968. This created some conflict of interest, as Kongsberg CEO Jens Christian Hauge sat on Norcontrol's board. For 1968 Norsk Data had a revenue of NOK 730,000, sold four computers plus additional memory for SAM 2, had thirteen employees at the end of the year and had a profit of NOK 21,000. That year a cooperation started with NEBB to develop an automatic hydroelectricity reservoir regulation system with a Nord-1 at its heart. The first system was installed in 1970 and remained in use for eighteen years.

Originally every user of the Nord-1 coded their own operating system (OS). This was highly inefficient and ND decided to launch a common OS. Sintran was developed at SINTEF in Trondheim. Later Sintran II was launched. This was the first major competitive edge ND had on Kongsberg. In 1969 the company relocated to a larger facility. The following year, fifteen Nord-1s were manufactured and the company had 88 employees. During these years Norsk Data secured a customer base in universities, college and research institutions in Norway. By 1971 nearly every such institution had a Nord-1 computer. NOK 2 million in venture capital was received in 1971.

== Internationalization ==
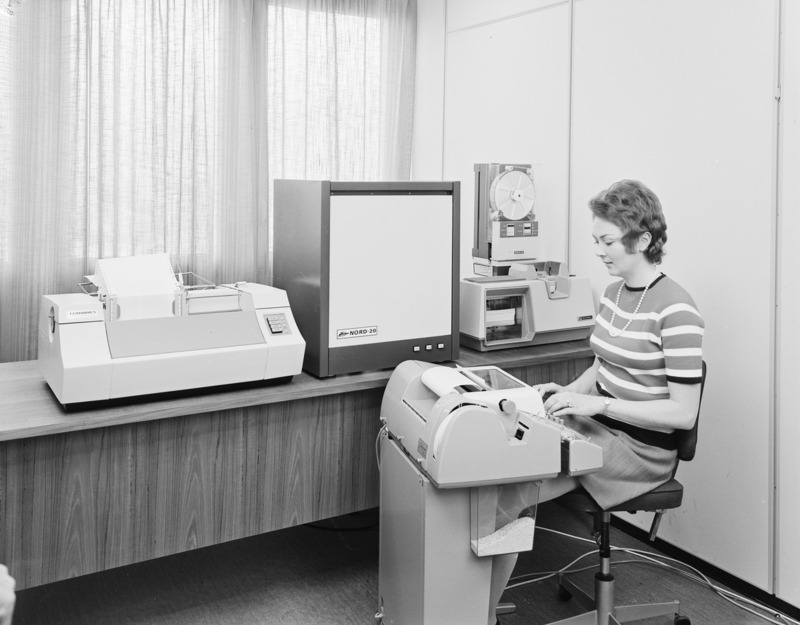
Norsk Data employee working at a Nord-20 computer in 1971

Monrad-Krohn was appointed professor of digital technology at NTH in December 1969. He chose to combine the professorship with the position as CEO of Norsk Data. Stord Verft took delivery of the first Nord-20 the following year and Norcontrol took delivery of the first of its 28 Nord-4s. The first major conflict in top management took place in February 1971 regarding a new organizational structure, with Monrad-Krohn on the one side and Bjørge and Skår on the other. Although revenue continued to rise, the company failed to create good profit margins. The issues caused two board members to resign and in June ten employees were laid off after orders were NOK 3 million below budget.

The company was saved by a NOK 6-million contract with the Norwegian Meteorological Institute which ND won in February 1971 in competition with major international players. The Nord Integrated Computer System (Nordic) was completed in April 1972 and consisted of three Nord-1s and a new Nord-5. This configuration was claimed to be the first 32-bit minicomputer in the world, employing the Nord-5 as a number cruncher while the Nord-1s would handle smaller tasks. One of these was used to collect information from a global network of weather stations.

When the project finished Norsk Data was without orders. Sales representatives were not appreciated in the company and were typically fired about once a year. The company's strategy was to create excellent products which could sell themselves. As the twenty-five people involved in the Nordic project were not required elsewhere, they were moved to the marketing department. It was first with this move that the company's management started realizing the importance of marketing. However, other non-technical departments, especially finances, had also not been keeping up with the company's growth. Kolbjørn Johansen was therefore hired as chief financial officer in 1969. The board decided on 18 October 1972 to replace Monrad-Krohn with Johansen as CEO, with the former becoming chair of the board. He would within a few years leave Norsk Data and establish Mycron and Tiki Data.

Bo Lewendal was hired in 1970 and was set to lead the development of a timesharing system, Nord-TSS. Monrad-Krohn articulated in 1972 that he hoped for the company to first grow into Scandinavia and then Europe. He emphasized that ND's small size was an advantage, as it allowed quicker production of newer and thus faster computers. The company decided to participate with eighty-seven other suppliers to win a contract with the European Organization for Nuclear Research (CERN) for its accelerator. The first tender was unsuccessful, but a delegation from CERN visited all the European manufacturers, largely out of courtesy as they had a long history of choosing American suppliers. ND chose to only demonstrate the computer from a terminal, rather than display the hardware.

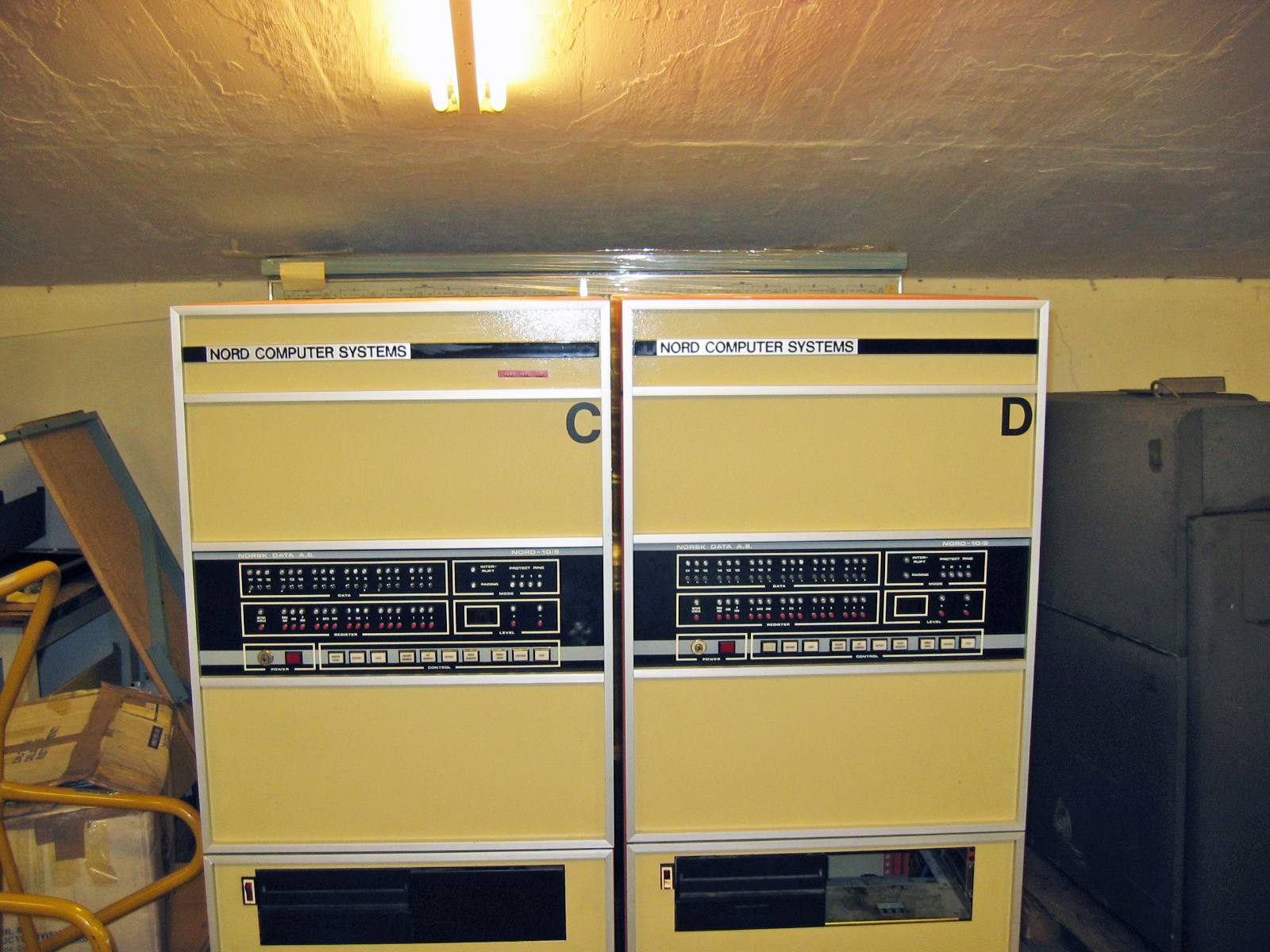
Twin Nord-10 unit

ND bid sixty percent lower than the prototype supplyer, Digital Equipment Corporation, and ND was only underbid by three manufacturers, all which were found to not meet their technical criteria by CERN. A decision was taken by CERN's technical committee on 19 September 1972, in which German and French interest failed to get their technically disqualified and higher priced Mitra and Dietz computers selected. The decision fell on Norsk Data, with the contract signed in January 1973. The computer was delivered and accepted on 12 July 1973, twelve days after the contract specified. The contract included twenty-four computers and a revenue of NOK 12 million.

Norsk Data took a strategic decision to abandon their role as system supplier for a few, large customers and decided to become a European-wide minicomputer supplier which could compete directly with American manufacturers. Sintran III was launched as a further development of Sintran II which included Nord-TSS and introduced virtual memory, which was launched with a new generation of hardware, the Nord-10, in 1973. CERN later followed up with purchasing a Nord-10 in 1975 for their largest department. Additional orders were made and by the end of 1976 CERN were operating fifty ND computers. The delivery to CERN combined with a more efficient software portfolio with the Nord-10 were key factors in the continued growth. For instance, ND delivered a turn-key system for meteorology in Algeria in 1974, complete with software developed in-house. Half the company's revenue came from international sales that year.

== Market orientation ==
Norsk Data continued to undermine marketing until the mid-1970s. Sales personnel had low wages, little to no influence on product development, high turnover, and were often trained in engineering rather than business. In the first years, ND sales representatives wore jeans and would present the products to other engineers and computer personnel, with the focus on the technical details. This changed in the mid-1970s when the company started selling computers to the business sector, where the customer representatives typically were heads of the accounting or warehouse departments. These instead expected suit-dressed salesmen and were interested in issues regarding efficiency and reliability. Profits, and the profit-based bonuses, sank through these years, giving an incentive for technical personnel to give marketing increased importance.

The first sale in Sweden was to ASEA-Atom in 1974 to control nuclear power plants. A Swedish subsidiary was established the following year. Because of the proprietary system architecture of each manufacturer, companies would fall into a vendor lock-in; therefore purchase of computer systems were often more of a strategic than product-specific purchase. An important aspect for ND was therefore to convince their potential customers that they would be able to deliver in the long run.

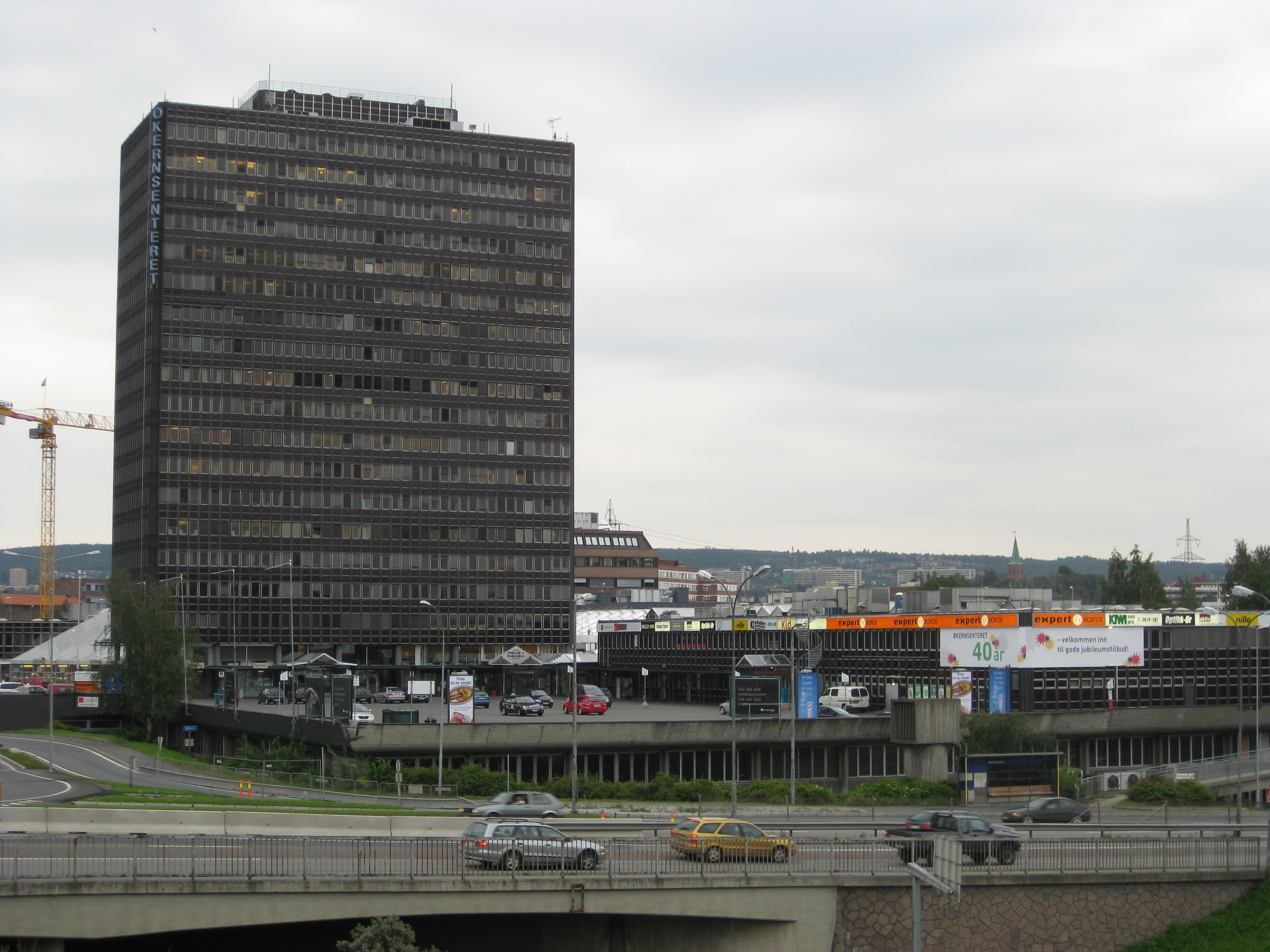
Økernsenteret where Norsk Data had offices throughout most of the 1970s

Sintran II VS and the Nord-50 were released in 1975. The following year the company had a revenue of NOK 81 million, NOK 4 million in profits and 221 employees. In 1977 subsidiaries were established in Germany and the United Kingdom. In Oslo, ND moved into a second facility, in Furuset. By then there was an uproar against Johansen within the organization as he was regarded by many as too empathetic; this had caused him to several times not make hard enough decisions and other times let the decisions be taken by others. He was replaced by Skår as CEO on 8 November.

From the mid-1970s ND started serving a more differentiated customer base and was increasingly dependent on the sales force coming with feedback as to which functionality needed to be developed. Norsk Tipping was in the first years of the 1970s the first customer to apply an ND system to accounting. The software was developed and owned by ND, but Skår rejected proposals that the company should develop a portfolio of administrative software. At the time this was based on the strategy that the high profit margins were in the central parts of the hardware while independent software firms were not making money. Towards the end of the 1970s this strategy started to backfire, as hardware-oriented customers, such as universities, were pressing down prices while companies which wanted turn-key solutions were increasingly willing to pay full price.

The Central Institute ported the database program Sibas in 1975 on the ND platform based on the Univac Fortran IV source. The first commercial ND system which was sold to handle a database was to Jonas Øglænd. The second contract was to Vinmonopolet and required remote terminals in Bergen and Trondheim. In 1976 Norsk Data won a contract with the Norwegian State Railways to manage their fleet of goods wagons. This was achieved by connecting the 150 terminals via XMSG and remained in use until 1990. The same system was delivered to the Swedish Armed Forces. ND started working on a system for the National Insurance Service, but delays caused the system to not be ordered until 1984, in which more than half the system was delivered by IBM.

Data Logic developed in 1975 typesetting software for the ND platform for Amedia in Sweden. ND decided to start a campaign to sell typesetting computers to Norwegian newspapers and developed along with Data Logic GMS-12, later renamed Nortext. The first client were Arbeiderbladet, Østlendingen and Dagbladet the following year, but sales were slow after that.

An important contract was signed in the aftermath of Norway, Denmark, the Netherlands and Belgium ordering the F-16 Fighting Falcon fighter jets. The Americans were obliged to use subcontractors from these countries in areas where they were competitive. Norsk Data put its eye on the simulator, as only two other manufacturers, Interdata and Systems Engineering Laboratories, had previously built similar systems. Norsk Data originally cooperated with the small simulator manufacturer Hydrosystems, but this spurred Singer Link, the world's largest manufacturer, to investigate ND's systems. In the end, three of four simulator contenders bid with ND-based systems, combining Nord-50 and Nord-10/S machines, and the contract was awarded to Singer Link.

== Tandberg ==
1975 saw the creation of a new government plan to consolidate the Norwegian information technology industry into three companies: Tandberg, Elektrisk Bureau and Kongsberg, which would become the "cornerstone companies". The plan was launched by Hauge, who started negotiations of purchasing Mikkelsen's shares in both Norcontrol and Norsk Data. He chose to sell Norcontrol to Kongsberg, but would not sell Norsk Data. The government continued to press the issue and promised a large grant to the industry if it merged, but Norsk Data stood on its rejection.

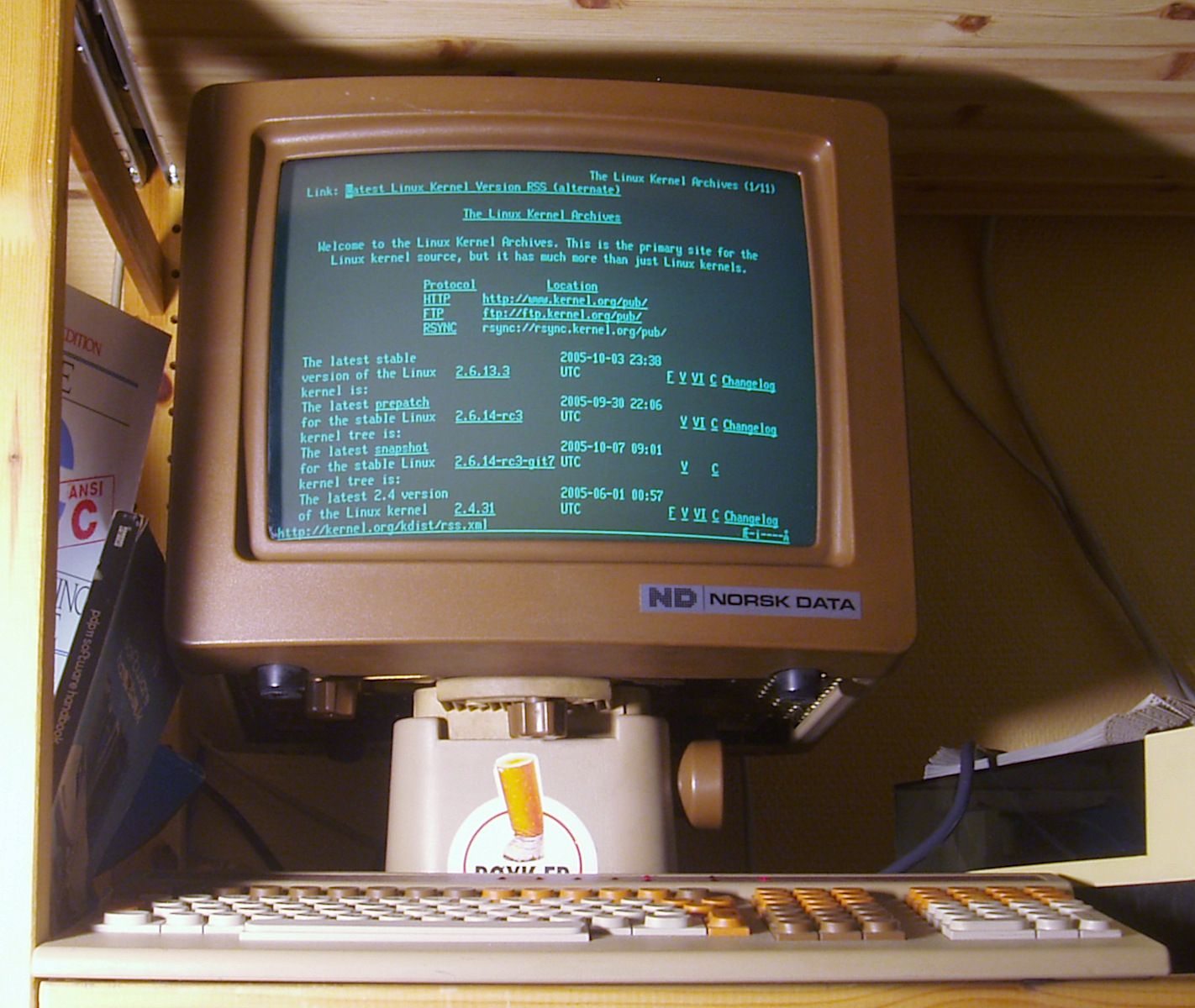
Norsk Data was a major customer of Tandberg Data's TDV-2215 terminals, as they were bundled with ND minicomputers

By December 1978, one of the cornerstones, Tandberg, filed for bankruptcy. The company was split up and Norsk Data became one of the shareholders, although the computer division, Tandberg Data, was separated out from the main company and bailed out by Siemens and the Norwegian state. Siemens had been a major customer of Tandberg computer equipment and featured one Tandberg model in its office computing range.

In April 1979 Norsk Data agreed to take over Tandberg's training materials' division and its facilities at Skullerud in Oslo, which would give ample space for expansion. However, Parliament decided in May that they wanted Tandberg to continue operations in the same scale, and offered a NOK 105-million subsidy and a large discount in the Skullerud facility to Norsk Data if they took over all of Tandberg. ND accepted the deal and paid NOK 12 million for 92 percent of the company, the last part being owned by the Industrial Development Corporation of Norway. Tandberg saw a NOK 13-million loss of a NOK 130 million revenue in 1979, which were consolidated into Norsk Data's accounts. Not until a February 1980 deal with Mobil secured a NOK 25-million advance did the company stop being a burden.

There was a bad relationship between the two companies, in part caused by opposition from within Tandberg against a start-up managing the old company's affairs. Tandberg had split its production between Skullerud and Kjelsås, also in Oslo, which was part of its inefficiency problems. A relocation to Kjelsås was desired, but this resulted in a struggle between the two companies regarding a NOK 20-million advance that Tandberg had paid ND. When resolved, this allowed ND to Take over the Skullerud facilities. To eliminate the negative cash flow and debt in Tandberg, it was sold to ND's shareholders in early 1981.

== Office automation and publishing ==
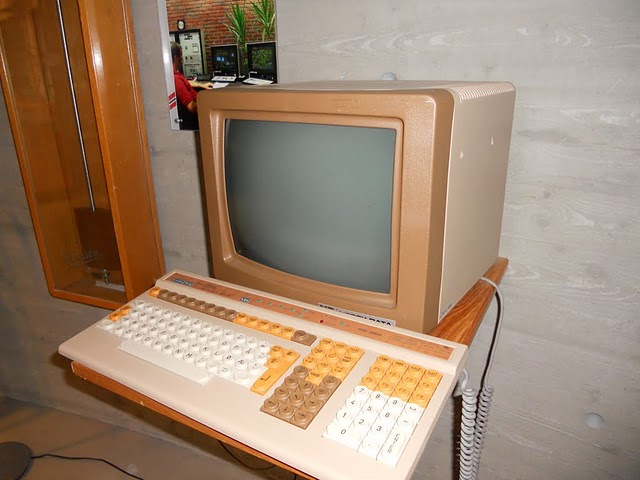
A Tandberg keyboard and monitor tailor-made for Norsk Data and Notis

Development of the office suite Notis started in January 1978 out of the existing expertise in typesetting and a desire to sell computers to the public sector. The word processing section was based on a program which had been developed by an employee while working at CERN and this was combined with systems for incorporating tables with figures such as budgets. The system also features search and e-mail. At first the QED text editor was used, but this was later replaced with TED, developed by Kvam Data. Notis was installed on all systems from 1980 and quickly became popular among customers. Because ND's screens were not optimized for text processing, from 1982 Tandberg Data delivered tailor-made keyboards and keyboards. Because text processing required high performance and extra peripherals, ND made high margins on the implementation.

ND bought the typesetting system Comtec in 1981, which was combined with Nortext and resulted in large increases in the sale of the systems. In the British market, national and local newspapers adopted Norsk Data solutions, used in conjunction with full-colour printing presses, such as The Scotsman, Jersey Evening Post, and Swindon Advertiser.

== Boom ==
The Nord-100 was introduced in 1979, which was specialized at flexibility and focused on administrative applications. When Digital launched their VAX-11 in 1977, Norsk Data had already delivered its first 32-bit computer, the Nord-5, to three users, and had delivered ten units of its successor, the Nord-50. As the VAX-11 was 32-bit and regarded as a superminicomputer, Norsk Data did not initially see it as a competitor since the Nord-5 had much better processing power. The Nord-50 had similar processing power to the Nord-5, but was also not a general-purpose computer by itself, described in Norsk Data's own literature as a special-purpose computer. Also described as an "arithmetic processor", this 32-bit computer relied on a Nord-10 front-end processor that ran the SINTRAN III operating system, with the memory sharing arrangement between the Nord-10 and Nord-50 elements identified as imposing a "memory bottleneck". However, the role of the Nord-50 as a computational accelerator raised the possibility of Norsk Data offering the machine as a companion for other minicomputers.

Development of the successor to the Nord-50, the ND-500, started in 1978 but introduced a microarchitecture differing from that of the ND-100. Since the ND-500 was intended to be a more general-purpose machine than its predecessor, offering an upgrade path to 32-bit computing and thus competing with the VAX, such architectural changes necessitated the porting of the ND-100 application software portfolio to this new model. The computer was launched in 1981 but had fundamental performance limitations. Claimed to be much faster than the VAX, it did not meet customer expectations of being a multi-purpose computer and could not support multi-user computing at VAX levels of utilisation. Later models eventually improved the machine's performance and versatility, but this process of improvement to belatedly meet the original market expectations for the product stretched out over four years.

The company's struggle to bring the ND-500 to market as an effective competitor to the VAX affected its relationships with universities and academia, particularly with the company's reluctance to acknowledge the significance of Unix and its benefits for the sector. In failing to cultivate closer links with academia, the company failed to recognise the broader significance of Unix and associated interoperability standards at an early stage, impairing its strategy later on. However, sales to technical and scientific customers persisted, with a major customer for the ND-500 being the Joint European Torus (JET) project, which took delivery of twenty-seven ND-100 and ND-500 units. JET would eventually transition to a mixture of SPARCserver and X terminal products, beginning a 200 man-year migration effort over a two-year period in 1992.

Development of the ND-5000 started before the ND-500 was completed, with the aim of using newer hardware technologies to reduce the production cost of each system in higher production volumes. Crucially, such technologies would also remedy the limitations on performance experienced by the ND-500 series, permitting a scaling of performance to meet market demands. Thus, the company's Samson architecture ND-5000 machines employed CMOS gate arrays fabricated by LSI Logic. This technological migration entailed the adoption of electronic design automation tools for integrated circuit design, along with a process involving two-month fabrication cycles, substantially increasing development costs and potentially introducing costly delays upon design errors being made. The higher integration achieved permitted a halving of component count and a reduction in printed circuit boards from 21 to 3, with boards being interconnected to reduce signal distances and thus facilitate elevated clock frequencies.

Despite the fortuitous adoption of CMOS technology, mitigating power consumption and heat dissipation issues, Norsk Data's designers continued to publicly reject the adoption of "fashionable" RISC techniques in processor design, claiming a higher throughput for complex instructions in the ND-5000 architecture than that attained for "simple" instructions in competing RISC designs such as Hewlett-Packard's emerging PA-RISC architecture. However, like various RISC architectures, the ND-5000 architecture employed a four-stage pipeline and emphasised single-cycle instructions for "full-speed" execution. Such was the company's confidence that it publicly aired observations that several US-based minicomputer vendors were entering a period of serious hardship and that the company was considering the possibility of acquiring one of them, selling its own systems to the European customers of the acquired company while using it as a marketing vehicle in the US. It also continued to regard Unix as a niche product, of significance only in the Swedish defence market.

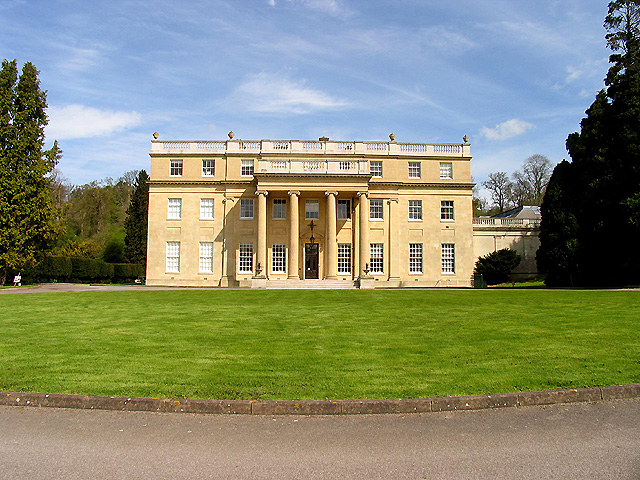
ND's European sales operations were based at Benham Park in Berkshire, England

Norsk Data's sales in the United Kingdom were originally handled by the agent Richard B. Norton. An ND-owned subsidiary was established in 1980 with the acquisition of Norton's business, and based at Benham Park, which the company bought and renovated. Between 1972 and 1981 the company had an average annual revenue increase of forty-five percent. It split its profits seventy percent to reinvest in the company and thirty percent as bonus. Such bonuses were only paid in good years and for the best years was equal to the salary. The company was a growth stock and only paid marginal dividends. Norsk Data became the second Norwegian company, after Norsk Hydro, to be listed on a foreign stock exchange. The company was listed on the London Stock Exchange in July 1981. It carried out a placement of shares worth NOK 30 million in August 1981 and for NOK 100 million in March 1982. ND received the Company of Year Award in 1983. The company's market capitalization was NOK 9 million in 1977, NOK 20 million in 1980 and NOK 4.5 billion in 1985.

ND introduced the marketing concept ND-SAFE in 1982, where the company focused on the scalability of the systems. Except for the municipal and university sectors, ND did not attempt at market segmentation to capture customers within a specific industry; this often made it difficult to sell as clients often found it difficult to purchase from a non-niche manufacturer. For instance, ND attempted to sell to the Scandinavian banking market; they were asked by clients if they would make this a prioritized market, but ND responded that they only would if they received sufficient sales. The answer caused the banking industry to go elsewhere for its products, despite an initial enthusiasm for ND's products.

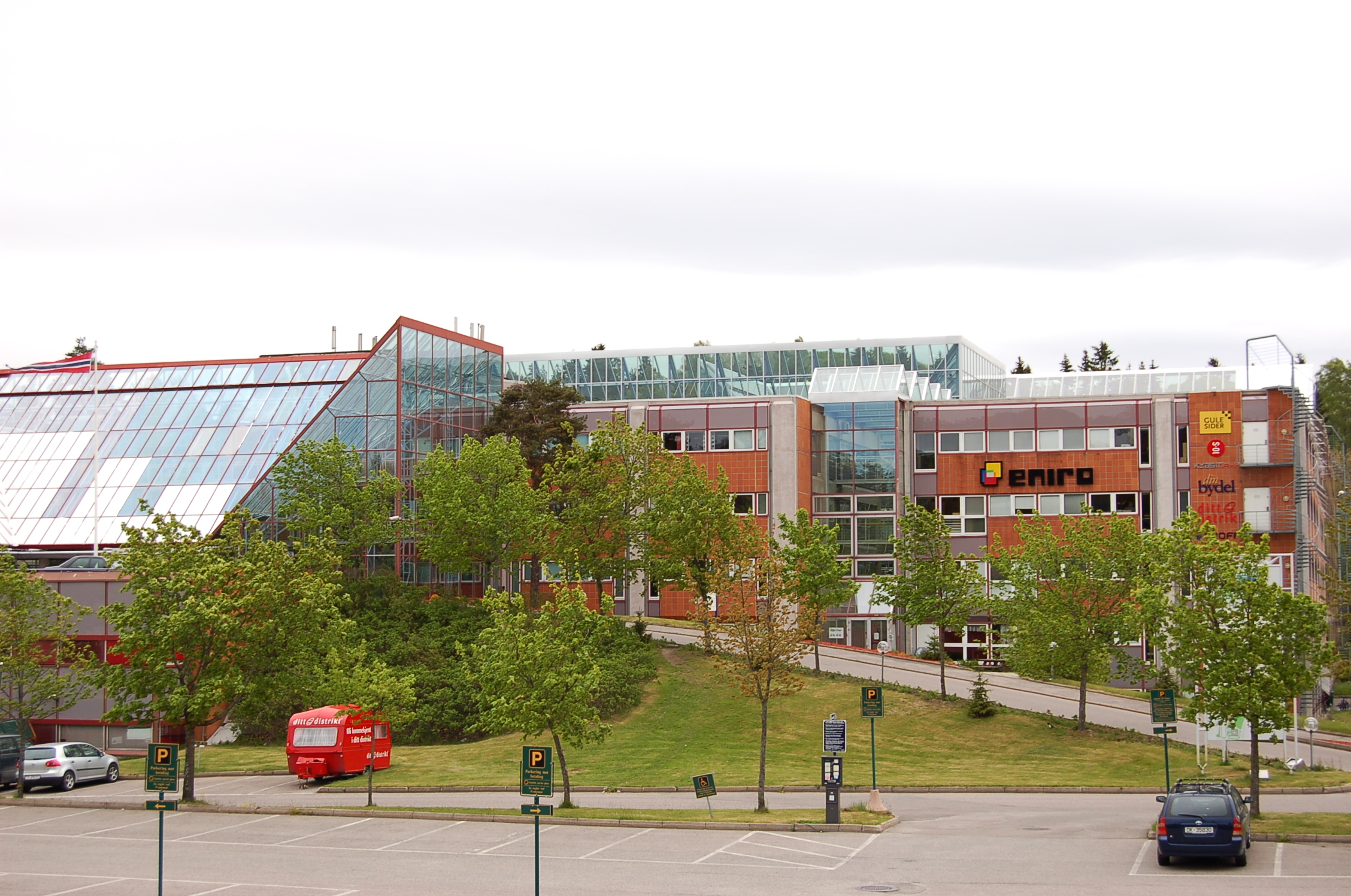
Norsk Data's head offices at Skullerud in Oslo

The company started the process of being listed on the NASDAQ exchange in New York in January 1983. No Norwegian company had previously been listed in the US; the legislation was not harmonized and there were restrictions on twenty percent foreign ownership of Norwegian companies. The limit was raised to forty-nine percent, but this was regarded by ND as too low, so they split the ownership into A- and B-shares, with and without voting rights. With this change, Norwegian authorities permitted an eighty percent foreign ownership in the company, but only the non-voting B shares were permitted to be listed on NASDAQ. The initial public offering brought in NOK 400 million in capital.

Norsk Data started a cooperation with Dietz Computer Systems for distribution of ND computers in Germany. ND became a majority shareholder in July 1983 and the following year Dietz was merged into ND. By 1985 Dietz' plant was producing ND systems and their old systems taken off the market. On 30 October 1984 ND and Matra signed an agreement where the latter would distribute ND computers in France, acquiring ND's French sales, marketing and support division. The deal also included the possibility of Matra producing Norsk Data systems under licence, collaboration on CMOS-based large-scale integration variants of the ND-500 series, and the development of "a 32-bit workstation based on ND technology". Previously, ND had sought to cooperate with Thomson and Bull, but found a more willing partner in Matra, itself having seen the failure of a collaboration with Datapoint. ND and Matra later announced plans to develop a "vectorial computer", potentially delivering "several hundreds of Mflops" of performance, within a three year timeframe.

Matra would also be involved in sales and support in France and Italy for machines produced by Norsk Data's joint venture with Racal Electronics, Racal-Norsk, also acquiring a licence to produce Racal-Norsk's Knowledge Processing System (KPS) models. Racal-Norsk had been established in May 1984 to combine Racal's expert systems interests with ND's minicomputer hardware, deriving its first product, the KPS-10, on ND's existing ND-570 model. Racal had struggled to make its expert system implementation run satisfactorily on the Symbolics 3600, but the ability to customise and expand the microcode of the ND-500 series for more efficient execution of languages such as Lisp, specifically ZetaLisp, and Smalltalk led to expectations of performance ten to twenty times that of Digital's VAX minicomputer. Initial deliveries of the KPS-10 occurred in March 1985, with a KPS-5 model based on the ND-550 also announced. Numerous competitors to the KPS models in the Lisp machine market included the Symbolics 3600, LMI Lambda, Xerox Dandelion and Texas Instruments Explorer, many being substantially cheaper than the projected £200,000 or more of the KPS-10. Despite interest in the KPS within the UK's Alvey Programme, the reported failure of the Racal-Norsk joint venture led researchers back to established Lisp machine products and to lower-cost machines.

Norsk Data exhibited perhaps its strongest financial performance in 1986. That year Datamation ranked it the world's 75th largest information technology company and the world's 13th largest minicomputer manufacturer. It was the world's third-most profitable and had the seventh-highest growth rate. That year the company's profits hit a record-high NOK 475 million from a revenue of NOK 2,576 million. Peak revenue was 2,934 million in 1989, while peak employment was 4,488 employees in 1987. In 1987, Norsk Data had the 50th highest revenue of Norwegian companies, but had the second-highest market capitalization, behind Norsk Hydro. One contemporary commentary of the company's strategy and management techniques concluded that in a minicomputer market continuing its rapid growth, "the odds for reaching the ambitious objectives of the firm should be rather high".

== Bust ==
During the mid-1980s, the market shifted such that customers went away from purchasing hardware and instead wanted complete systems including software, preferably tailor-made for the industry. This was a disadvantage for ND, as they had their advantage in designing hardware systems. Their lack of industry-specific software was combined with that all software development was outsourced, which meant that ND's most important sales arguments were being determined by a third party. Another development was the open standards, especially Unix, which was disliked at ND. This would remove the vendor lock-in and the well-liked Notis, which was instrumental in creating profits. Management had a high pressure from investors to create high growth rates, which again caused the company to choose short-term profit margins ahead of long-term strategic positioning.

As an increasing number of customers asked for open standard solutions, such as personal computers (PC) and Unix, ND started developing products to meet the demand. An ND PC was developed, but sold poorly. Development of ND's Unix variant, Ndix, began in 1984, leading to an initial release in 1985, but the product was only offered to customers insisting on Unix systems, and Ndix itself was only supported on certain hardware configurations. Developed initially by Logica under contract, Ndix development was absorbed by ND but not prioritised, proceeding so slowly that the hardware specified to run each new version was out of date by the time the software was completed. In contrast to various competitors who rebadged existing Unix systems as their own, ND chose to develop its own port for its own hardware. In addition, chiefly for reasons of cost, ND chose not to port its own software to Unix, despite demands for products such as Sibas and Notis from those customers willing to adopt Ndix. Sales were further reduced by ND's reluctance to commission software developers to port their programs to Ndix, such activities typically involving contracts worth hundreds of thousands of dollars and the loan of a system for the porting effort.

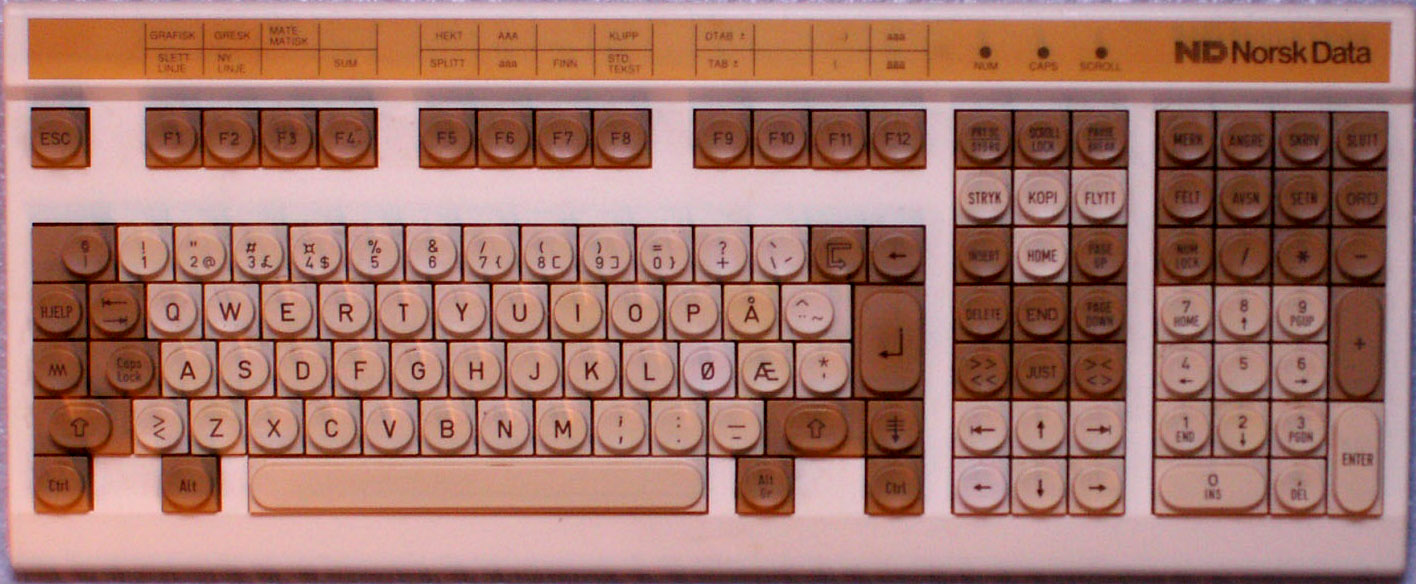
Tandberg-built ND keyboard for Notis

On 9 September 1986, the company's course division invited representatives form the largest customers to a dialog with ND's top management. While the management at the time believed they had an excellent product, the customers pointed at several weaknesses in the organization and products. In the middle of the meeting, Skår chose to leave to reach another meeting. A summary was distributed to all employees and soon was creating headlines in the press. The process also created mistrust and doubt within the organization and within a short time all the employees in the course division had quit.

ND's growth had provided opportunities for software developers, but this had complicated the purchasing decisions of potential customers along with the company's relationship with developers, who the company occasionally played off against each other when selling complete systems. Such developers, many offering systems specialised for various business needs, had low margins and were therefore in a precarious position. ND aimed to address some of these challenges by acquiring some of these software businesses, consolidating the combined product portfolio, also seeking to grow its own expertise in applications and thinning out the number of software provider partners over time.

The software companies Infologic and Data Inform were bought by ND in 1986, while ND and Fjellanger Widerøe established the cartography company Pumatec. The following year, Computas Complete and Alfa Data were bought and merged with Infologic to create ND Application, which had 350 employees. Much of the assembled portfolio consisted of horizontal applications, applicable to many industries but with low margins. However, some vertical applications such as those from Computas for material processing industries and Infologic for wholesalers, offered more profitable opportunities and these were to be emphasised.

ND Application was plagued by internal disputes over the technological foundations of the new portfolio and a large number of customer disputes, leaving little capacity for product development. The companies had been bought with a short-term goal to sell more minicomputers and ND lacked a strategic plan for them. The problem was deepened by a lack amongst the sales force of the intricate industry-specific knowledge needed to successfully sell the profitable vertical applications. Further problems arose in the United Kingdom with the acquisition of Wordplex, intended to provide the company with an avenue of rapid expansion through an established channel and a presence in various industries. A failure to integrate the new business ultimately reduced ND's once-successful UK subsidiary to "a zero-growth business without a goal or a vision".

Wordplex had itself struggled with profitability during "Britain's mid-1980s high tech slump", and during a refinancing effort, the company had been subject to a hostile takeover bid by Apricot Computers whose management had also prized Wordplex's presence in larger businesses, these including Imperial Chemical Industries, Marks & Spencer, Unilever and NatWest. Also faced with the emergence of low-cost competition from personal computer manufacturers, the company had sought to enter the broader office automation market, offering interoperability with Digital's ALL-IN-1 suite, and had announced a product based on Unix, later announcing Xenix for its Z8000-based Wordplex 8000 system. The company also introduced rebadged PC-compatibles made by Corona Data Systems and local area networking developed by Racal. Norsk Data's plan for Wordplex involved complementing the 8000 system with its own ND-110 and ND-5400 systems, also announcing Unix support.

Norsk Data had been central to the strategic changes at Matra Datasysteme, involving a pivot from microcomputing to scientific and technical minicomputing in late 1985, establishing substantial expectations from the collaboration. A vector computer project within the Eureka research programme was to develop systems with 20 MFLOPS to 100 MFLOPS of performance within a timeframe of four to five years, requiring an estimated investment of 500 million FRF. Matra also planned to substantially increase sales of Norsk Data hardware. Already in 1986, the collaboration struggled to meet these expectations, encountering public funding difficulties for its "desk-top vector processor" from a Norwegian government willing to pledge only 10% of the estimated 300 million FRF (or $43 million), as opposed to the one third share anticipated, requiring Norsk Data to fund the shortfall.

Tensions also arose over Matra's own agreement with Sun Microsystems to market and potentially build Sun-2 and Sun-3 workstations under licence, these being seen as a threat to ND's low-end minicomputers. Matra also partnered with Encore Computer to market its multiprocessor Unix-based Multimax systems. Norsk Data and Matra subsequently "scaled down" their agreement giving Matra exclusive marketing rights in France and Italy, leaving the scientific and technical markets to Matra, and allowing ND to supply other markets. Matra's own developments would see ND's products further marginalised, with its scientific minicomputer appearing as the X-MS 5000 alongside the X-MS 7000 rebranded from Encore and Matra's own X-MS 3000 Unix-based "artificial intelligence server" featuring a Motorola 68020 and up to eight "symbolic processors". Despite its efforts to market ND systems being categorised as having "disappointed", a "significant business" had been established in sales of "military workstations" incorporating ND minicomputers, but in 1989, Matra discontinued its computing operations and put such revenue sources into doubt.

Financial results and employment levels at Norsk Data (1983-1992)

After thirteen years of high annual growth, the sales flattened in 1987. On 16 October, the company announced that its sales targets for the year would not be met, and a planned placement of new shares was canceled. On the morning of 19 October 1987, the share price fell from NOK 240 to 180. By the end of trading on NASDAQ, the share price was down to NOK 120. The price continued to fall and hit NOK 80 some days later, in part because many employees had to sell shares to pay their taxes. The economy of Norway was hit hard and employees in ND were especially stricken because of their bonuses having been paid in shares. From 1988, ND stopped recruiting new employees. A reorganization took place in which all group leaders were laid off and told to apply for new jobs as project leaders. The issue resulted in severe bad media coverage.

The company started in early 1988 developing a strategy and products to switch ND's focus to open standards. The project was publicly launched on 11 April and included PCs, Unix-servers and software to link new and old systems. Upon questions from a journalist, ND also announced that they would not port ND Application's portfolio to Unix. However, the journalist's question made the executives realize they had not properly planned its strategy. ND became caught between two customer groups: one which was happy with the existing systems and wanted ND to continue to deliver its own system and software, and other which wanted open standards. ND's signals to switch to Unix caused the first group of customers to place their orders on hold, while new customers did not order because ND's Unix-based products did not exist yet.

ND started working to find new market segments it could create tailor-made systems for on top of its existing product lines. The first such market was computer-aided design and computer-aided manufacturing, but this was largely rejected by the international sales divisions. Of fear of the company failing completely to the side, projects were abandoned as was the Ndix project. 1988 became the first year since 1967 that Norsk Data did not make a profit. That year also saw the company's share equity halve.

== Spin-offs and finale ==
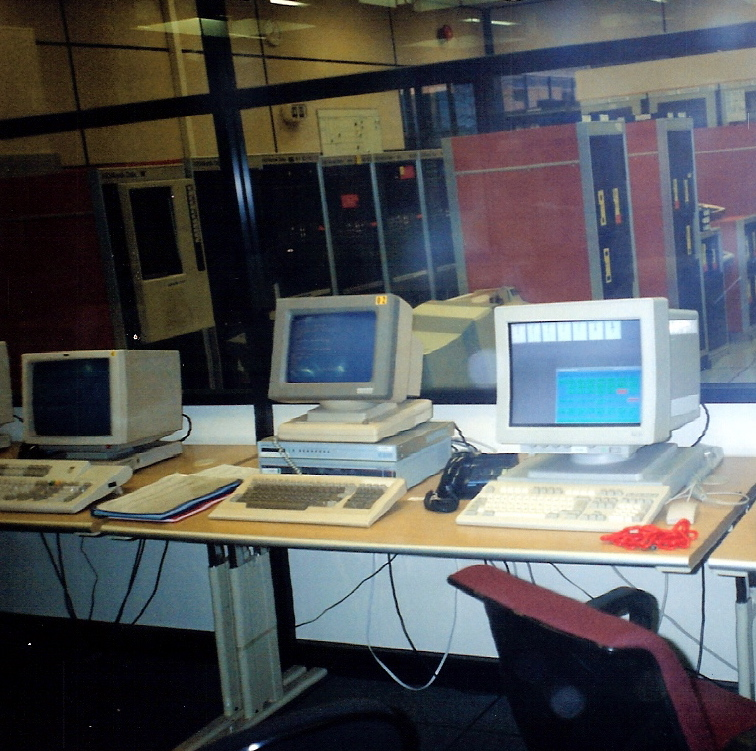
Personal computers in the foreground were in 1991 replacing the ND-100 and ND-500 computers in the background at Joint European Torus.

Management announced on 24 January 1989 a major restructuring of the company. The development division would be reduced from several hundred to less than a hundred employees, there would be large down-scaling in the foreign sales offices and the development of Unix-based systems would be spun off in Dolphin Server Technology. ND would not develop its own hardware any more, but purchase components from third parties, including Dolphin. At a public meeting, Skår responded to a question by stating that Notis would be replaced with new systems. Development of Notis was spun off in its own company, Notis AS, which continued to develop the program for ND. Sales fell dramatically as customers lost confidence in that ND could deliver the products in the future and by the internal process demotivating the sales employees. Only in Germany did sales not decrease during 1988 and 1989.

The financial problems were cause by a lack of focus on single market segments. ND had bought several software and hardware companies without a defined strategy, and often without adding new segments to the portfolio, as they often had overlapping products. The purchases were made in the hope that new software would bring new clients to choose ND hardware, which was the only product ND made profits from. Rolf Skår stated in 1988 that the company should focus on the banking industry, but this was never carried out. Sales had continued to fall during 1989, as customers were concerned that the Sintran-based product line would be discontinued.

Norsk Data engaged a number of consultancy companies to analyze the firm in 1989. One important finding was that the customers' perception of ND's strengths and weaknesses was completely different from the employees' perception. Another was that the customers did not understand ND's strategy and a general dissatisfaction with software and the high turnover in the sales force. Also administrative routines were found to be a shortcoming and one consultant company stated that ND was the company they had investigated which had the most room for improvement. Management introduced a company-wide program to increase all employees' focus on market orientation, but the top management carried out several public blunders in poor customer management through the press. Terje Mikkelsen started negotiations to sell ND to a major competitor, but no deal was ever made.

Skår resigned as CEO in August 1989 and was replaced by the newly hired Erik Engebretsen, who had a business education. This also resulted in several new people in the top management, which became dominated by businesspeople rather than engineers. In September, all jobs in the company's new organizational structure were announced and all ND employees had to apply for the new jobs. Several functions were outsourced, while the internal parts were organized as business units. These included ND StatsPartner for sales towards the central government, ND LokalPartner for sales to local government, ND BusinessPartner for sale towards selected large corporate clients and ND DataShop for sale of standardized products. These would then purchase products from ND ServiceTeam for hardware and ND SystemTeam, a continuation of ND Application. Towards the end of 1989 ND was able to turn the tide and experienced a growth in sales.

Thus the re-organized ND was in a situation where it sold PCs, Sintran systems and Unix systems. In January 1990, the business units started negotiating the internal prices. Although top management had originally proposed that the partners could buy services from outside the company and the teams sell outside the company, such transactions were stopped by top management. ServiceTeam achieved high internal prices through the negotiations as they held all the cards. With the introduction of standard hardware platforms, computer manufacturers had to deliver unique software portfolios to avoid a pure price competition. With the spin-off of Notis, ND allowed one of their few competitive advantages to be available for all platforms. The three partner divisions were pure sales divisions and secured all the revenue for the team-divisions and DataShop. However, the partner divisions had very low margins so the profits were being made in the other business units, and thus receiving the praise of top management.

The reorganizing also made a drastic change to the corporate culture. While ND previously had allowed a high degree of autonomy for its employees and divisions, issues became increasingly top-managed. Motivation and sales dropped, and the company lost much of its ability to get employees to work free overtime. In early 1991 a new round of layoffs was carried through, followed by a new reorganization. New control mechanisms were introduced to ensure that all employees understood the new model. Few employees would admit to not understanding it, but in reality most did not, enhancing the problem. New rounds of lay-offs took place in June and September, the latter consisting of 500 people. ND lost all its large customers and signed no large contracts in 1990 and 1991. One of the main reasons was that sales personnel were forced to call back to the office to confirm every step in negotiations.

By then the partner divisions were merged to NordPartner, later renamed ND-Partner. In October 1991 the division was sold to Siemens Nixdorf, Siemens Nixdorf were, at the time, the largest single supplier of minicomputer systems to the Norwegian state, measured in terms of installations, due to a "dominant position at a minority of customers". Norsk Data remained the vendor with the broadest presence in the bureaucracy with a slightly lower share of this market. Together, the companies accounted for a 38% share of surveyed installations. The deal was set against a backdrop of a pronounced transition from minicomputers to servers and from proprietary, vendor-specific operating systems to standards-based or commodity operating systems such as Unix and OS/2, with both companies suddenly and rapidly losing market share to new entrants offering client-server solutions.

SystemTeam was sold to Avenir and the buildings at Skullerud to a contractor. ND lost NOK 810 million in 1991, and with an eighty percent decrease was the European company to have the second-largest share price loss in 1991. After failed negotiations over many months to sell Comtec, including a bid from QED Technology prevented by administrative proceedings at its parent company, Maxwell Communication Corporation, ND made plans to close the division in February 1992. The Comtec business was later acquired by Sysdeco. This was followed up with the sale of Technovision to Intergraph in March 1992.

Intergraph reportedly continued maintenance of Technovision's 2D portfolio, migrating users of its 3D portfolio to its own products. Prior to the Intergraph acquisition, various employees of Norsk Data in Kongsberg who were part of the Technovision organisation founded their own company, Kongsberg 3D Partner, independently acquiring non-exclusive rights to various 3D software modules. The company also undertook development work for Intergraph.

Tor Alfheim took over as CEO in July 1992. DataShop was sold in late August to a group of investors from the company's management. The following month ND ServiceTeam, which at the time had 560 employees, was renamed Comma. The company cited the reason as being that the Norsk Data brand no longer entailed confidence among customers. As the only profitable part of ND, it was able to make a NOK 100-million profit in 1992. The revenue and margins were being made on selling Sintran-based systems to existing customers, and was described by an analyst as "having a monopoly of a melting iceberg" and that the company was not creating a new customer base of non-Sintran systems. Norsk Data was delisted from Oslo Stock Exchange on 2 March 1993. Formula Open Soft was sold to Merkantildata effective 1 April.

ND started debt settlement proceedings at Oslo District Court on 11 May 1993. On 31 December, Norsk Data merged with Nordic Data and Comma to create Comma Data Services, which had 800 employees. Existing shares in the company were rendered worthless as the company's creditors received 25 percent of their claims and the new company became owned by the two largest creditors, Den norske Bank (70 percent) and Fokus Bank (30 percent). On 30 November, Dolphin had been announced closed and all employees were laid off, but on 23 December it was instead sold to Telenor-owned TBK Telematikk, and 33 of the 55 employees were reinstated. In early 1994, Dolphin announced an exit from systems manufacturing and its effective abandonment of Motorola's 88000 architecture, seeing employees leave for the spun-out Dolphin Interconnect Solutions and a start-up intending to support Dolphin's Brazilian customers. By 1995, the former Dolphin operation had become a "pure consultancy" business known as Telenor Dolphin, as TBK itself rebranded to Telenor Bedrift. Telenor itself made an offer to acquire Comma in March 1995, prompting a rival bid by Kjell Inge Røkke backed by former Norsk Data shareholders. However, Telenor's acquisition was completed in May 1995.
