= List of early third-generation computers =

This list of early third-generation computers, tabulates those computers using monolithic integrated circuits (ICs) as their primary logic elements, starting from small-scale integration CPUs (SSI) to large-scale integration CPUs (LSI). Computers primarily using ICs first came into use about 1961 for military use. With the availability of reliable low-cost ICs in the mid 1960s commercial third-generation computers using ICs started to appear.

The fourth generation of computers began with the shipment of CPS-1, the first commercial microprocessor microcomputer, in 1972 and for the purposes of this list marks the end of the "early" third-generation computer era. Third-generation computers were offered well into the 1990s.

The list is organized by delivery year to customers or production/operational date. In some cases only the first computer from any one manufacturer is listed. Computers announced, but never completed, are not included. Computers without documented manual input (keyboard/typewriter/control unit) are also not included.

== Aerospace and military computers (1961–1971) ==
1961

- The ASD Semiconductor-Network Computer (Molecular Electronic Computer), first monolithic integrated circuit general purpose computer (built for demonstration purposes, programmed to simulate a desk calculator) was built by Texas Instruments for the US Air Force.

1962

- Martin MARTAC 420 (Fairchild Micrologic)
- AC Spark Plug MAGIC (Fairchild Micrologic)
- Librascope L-90 series (silicon planar epitaxial semiconductor IC)

1963

- UNIVAC 1824
- Autonetics D37 (Solid Circuit, Texas Instruments)

1965

- Apollo Guidance Computer First installation
- Burroughs D84
- Litton L-304 - TTL IC
- Honeywell ALERT - HLTTL IC
- Autonetics D26 - DTL IC

1967

- Ballistic Research Laboratories Electronic Scientific Computer Model II (BRLESC II)
- CDC 449
- CP-823/U

1970

- AN/UYK-7
- Rolm 1601 (AN/UYK-12(V)), Feb 1970

1971

- AN/GYK-12 Militarized version of Litton L-3050

== Commercial computers (1965–1971) ==
This table of commercial third-generation computers has been constructed by merging of several lists of computers offered from February 1965, the date of the shipment of the first commercial third-generation computer, through 1971 and then finding reliable sources as to the generation of the models listed and the associated dates.

Date (Note: Unless otherwise noted date is "first customer shipment" or "first practical demonstration" taken from the following sources listed in priority order: 1. Dates with reliable sources in linked Wikipedia articles; 2. Digital Computer Census (1964-1974); 3. Auerbach EDP Series No.4 - Minicomputers, Appendix C. Product Comparison charts; 4. Dead Medium: Dead computational platforms, dead mainframes, and their dates; To the extent there is a conflict between sources, only the highest priority source is used.)	Manufacturer	Model	Comment
Feb 1965	Scientific Data Systems	SDS 92	First commercial third-generation computer
Sep 1965	Systems Engineering Laboratories, Inc.	810	
Oct 1965	ASI Computer Division of Electro-Mechanical Research, Inc. (Note: ASI became EMR-Computer in 1964. Later sold to Univac.)	ASI 6070	
Nov 1965	Systems Engineering Laboratories, Inc.	840	
Dec 1965	Honeywell Information Systems	2200	
Jan 1966	Computer Control Company	DDP-124	
Jan 1966	Honeywell Information Systems	1200	
Feb 1966	ASI Computer Division of Electro-Mechanical Research, Inc.	ASI 6050	
Feb 1966	Honeywell Information Systems	120	
Jun 1966	Honeywell Information Systems	DDP 516	
Jul 1966	RCA	Spectra 70/35, /45 & /55	
Aug 1966	Systems Engineering Laboratories, Inc.	810A/840A	
Nov 1966	Ferranti	Argus 400	
Nov 1966	Hewlett-Packard, Co.	2116A	
Dec 1966	Business Information Technology	BIT 480	
Dec 1966	Scientific Data Systems	Sigma 7	
Jan 1967	Scientific Data Systems	Sigma 2	
Feb 1967	General Electric	GE 4020 (in Japanese)	
Mar 1967	Interdata, Inc.	Interdata 3	
Apr 1967	Electronic Associates, Inc.	EAI 640	
May 1967	Honeywell Information Systems	4200	
May 1967	Standard Computer Corporation	IC6000	
Jun 1967	Univac	9200 & 9300	
Jun 1967	Varian Data Machines	620/i	
Aug 1967	Burroughs	B2500/3500	
Aug 1967	Xerox Data Systems	Sigma 5	
Sep 1967	Elbit Computers, Ltd.	100	
Oct 1967	Marconi	Myriad II	Uses DTL
Oct 1967	ASI Computer Division of Electro-Mechanical Research, Inc.	ASI 6130	
Oct 1967	Digiac Corporation	3080C	
Oct 1967	Raytheon Computer	703	
Dec 1967	Honeywell Information Systems	125	
Jan 1968	Systems Engineering Laboratories, Inc.	840MP	
Jan 1968	General Automation, Inc.	SPC-12	
Apr 1968	Computer Automation, Inc.	PDC 808	Uses DTL circuits
Apr 1968	Digital Equipment Corp.	PDP-8/I	
Apr 1968	Hewlett-Packard, Co.	2115A	
c. Apr 1968	Spear	Micro-LINC 300	Uses MECL
May 1968	Texas Instruments, Inc	980	
Jun 1968	Honeywell Information Systems	1648	
Jul 1968	Hewlett-Packard, Co.	2116B	
Jul 1968	Redcor Corporation	RC-70	
Aug 1968	Honeywell Information Systems	1250	
Sep 1968	Honeywell Information Systems	110	
Sep 1968	National Cash Register	Century 100	
Sep 1968	Standard Computer Corporation	IC4000	
Sep 1968	Systems Engineering Laboratories, Inc.	810B	
Oct 1968	Digital Equipment Corp.	PDP-8/L	
Oct 1968	Hewlett-Packard, Co.	2114A	
Oct 1968	Varian Data Machines	520/i	
Nov 1968	General Automation, Inc.	SPC-8	
Nov 1968	RCA	Spectra 70/46	
Dec 1968	Bailey Meter	855	
Dec 1968	Computer Automation, Inc.	PDC 816	Used TTL for logic
Dec 1968	Honeywell Information Systems	DDP 416	
Dec 1968	Honeywell Information Systems	H632	
Dec 1968	Micro Systems, Inc	Micro 800/810 (Note: Sold in Europe as Intertechnique Multi-8)	TTL MSI, Core Memory, Microprogrammed
1968	Fujitsu, Ltd.	FACOM230-25, -35, -45	
Feb 1969	Data General	Nova	
Feb 1969	Honeywell Information Systems	8200	
Mar 1969	Fujitsu, Ltd.	FACOM-R (Note: Generation 3 estimated based upon dates of other older models from manufacturer)	
Mar 1969	Lockheed Electronics	MAC-16	
Mar 1969	Raytheon Computer	706	
Apr 1969	Burroughs	B8500	
Apr 1969	Philips Electrologica Limited	P350 series	
Apr 1969	Scientific Control Corporation	SCC 4700	
May 1969	Datacraft Corporation	DC-6024/1	
May 1969	Univac	9400	
Jun 1969	National Cash Register	Century 200	
Jun 1969	Honeywell Information Systems	H316	
Jun 1969	Standard Computer Corporation	IC7000	
Jul 1969	Burroughs	B6500	
Aug 1969	Westinghouse Electric	2500	
Sep 1969	Tempo Computers, Inc.	1/1-A	
Nov 1969	Hewlett-Packard, Co.	2114B	
Dec 1969	IBM	360/85	
Dec 1969	Xerox Data Systems	Sigma 3	
1969	International Computers and Tabulators	ICT 1900A	
Jan 1970	Business Information Technology	BIT 483	
Jan 1970	GRI Computer Corp.	GRI 909	
Jan 1970	IBM	System/3	
Feb 1970	Digital Equipment Corp.	PDP-15	
Feb 1970	Honeywell Information Systems	3200	
Feb 1970	Datacraft Corporation	DC-6024/3	
Feb 1970	CII	Iris 50	
Early 1970	U. of Illinois	ILLIAC IV	
Mar 1970	Digital Scientific Corp.	META 4	
Apr 1970	Digital Equipment Corp.	PDP-11/20	
Apr 1970	Raytheon Computer	704	
Apr 1970	Viatron Computer Systems Corp.	Viatron 2140 & 2150	
May 1970	Data General	SuperNova	
May 1970	General Automation, Inc.	SPC-16	
Jun 1970	Texas Instruments, Inc	960	
Jul 1970	Unicomp, Inc.	COMP-16	
Aug 1970	Digital Computer Controls, Inc	DCC-112	
Sep 1970	RCA	Spectra 70/60	
Sep 1970	Wang Laboratories, Inc.	Wang 3300	
Sep 1970	Philips Business Systems, Inc.	P850/855/860	
Fall 1970	Datamate Computer Systems, Inc.	70	
before Nov 1970	GRI Computer Corporation	99	
before Nov 1970	Varisystems Corporation	PAC-16/2	
Dec 1970	Modular Computer Systems, Inc	III	
1970	Fujitsu, Ltd.	FACOM230-15	
1970	Unicomp, Inc.	COMP-18	
Jan 1971	IBM	370/155	
Feb 1971	RCA	Spectra 70/61	
Mar 1971	Digital Equipment Corp.	PDP-8/E	
Mar 1971	General Electric	GE 655	
Apr 1971	Data General Corp.	Nova 800	
Apr 1971	IBM	370/165	
Jun 1971	IBM	370/145	
Dec 1971	Data General Corp.	Nova 1200	
1971	Fujitsu, Ltd.	FACOM230-45S	

== See also ==
- List of early microcomputers
