= Parallel Computers, Inc. =

American computer manufacturing company

Parallel Computers, Inc. was an American computer manufacturing company, based in Santa Cruz, California, that made fault-tolerant computer systems based around the Unix operating system and various processors in the Motorola 68000 series.

== History ==
The company was founded in 1983 and was premised on the idea of providing a less expensive alternative to existing fault-tolerant solutions, one that would be attractive to smaller businesses. Over time it received some $21 million of venture capital funding. Parallel Computers was part of a wave of technology companies that were based in that area during the 1980s, the Santa Cruz Operation being the most well-known of them. Parallel Computers was also one of a number of new companies focusing on fault-tolerant solutions that were inspired by the success of Tandem Computers. Other such companies included Encore Computer, Stratus Computer, Tolerant Systems, Sequoia Systems, Synapse Computer, Auragen Systems, No Halt Computers, Corinthian Systems, Enmasse, and Computer Consoles Inc.

Parallel Computers made systems that featured redundant hardware elements from processors and storage to power supplies, and that self-detected error situations. Their systems fit into the supermicrocomputer to minicomputer ranges in size. The difficulties of building fault-tolerant systems were considerable, however, including the unsuitability of Unix in that era for that purpose, and Parallel Systems like the other new companies in the space severely underestimated the engineering tasks involved. Significant product delays resulted as a consequence, as did layoffs, and Parallel Computers changed its chief executive during 1984.

By 1986 Parallel had some $6 million in annual sales and employed 40 people. However it had made fewer than a hundred sales, and one industry analyst surmised that the small business marketplace Parallel was targeting was often not sophisticated enough to recognize the value of fault-tolerant solutions. Moreover, the company's sales force was too small to scale up and its manufacturing capabilities were limited. Parallel had OEM agreements with the likes of Scientific Games Corporation, and used resellers in the United Kingdom such as Systime Computers Ltd, but sales were few through these channels as well.

Accordingly, Parallel's management decided the company was not viable on its own, and Parallel Computers was sold to General Automation in 1987, becoming a wholly owned subsidiary. It was then sold again in 1988, to the British computer manufacturing firm Integrated Micro Products (IMP), following disappointing sales of the Parallel product. Following that, the Parallel Computers production facility in Los Gatos, California was shut down and all manufacturing was moved to the north of England. IMP, by then focusing on telecommunications equipment, was eventually acquired by Sun Microsystems in March 1996 for $96 million.
