= Brush Development Company =

Former manufacturer in Cleveland, US

Brush Development Company was a manufacturer of audio, phonographic products and magnetic recording technologies located in Cleveland, Ohio. It was absorbed into Clevite in 1952.

== History ==
The business was founded in 1919 by Alfred L. Williams as Brush Labs to develop products that used piezoelectric crystals. Associates spun off the Brush Development Company in 1930, with piezoelectric phonograph pickups as their main product. Later, it began manufacturing wire recorders, microphones, and speakers.

During World War II, Vice President for Research Dr. Semi Joseph Begun was awarded a contract from the US National Defense Research Council for research on a substitute for stainless steel wire used in wire recorders by the military.

Brush was instrumental in convincing the Minnesota Mining and Manufacturing Company - 3M to research recording tape. Its successful lab work resulted in a commercial product, the first in its long series of magnetic recording tape and other media products. Post-war, Brush manufactured a dictation recorder in 1946, and released the first USA built tape recorder in 1947 with the Brush Soundmirror. In 1950, Brush built the Model BL-206 and BL-216 Multichannel Oscillographs, and associated Model BL-932 DC Amplifiers.

In 1952, Brush Development Company merged with the original Brush Labs and the Cleveland Graphite Bronze company to create Clevite. Audio products continued to be sold under the Brush trademark until 1960.

The Clevite company was absorbed by Gould-National Batteries in 1969.

== Sources ==
- Gerard M. Foley. personal recollections of work sponsored at Battelle Memorial Institute by Brush 1943–1945.
