= Powernode 9080 =

32-bit superminicomputer produced by Gould Electronics

The PowerNode 9080 was a dual processor 32-bit superminicomputer produced by Fort Lauderdale, Florida based electronics company Gould Electronics in the 1980s. Its UTX/32 4.3BSD Berkeley Unix-based operating system was one of the first multi-processor shared memory implementations of Unix, although the processors operated in a Master-Slave configuration with a Mutual Exclusion (MutEx) lock on all manipulations on Kernel tables. The second processor, called IPU, left all I/O operations to the main CPU. Machines could be configured for either single or dual processor operation. At launch in the mid-eighties the PowerNode 9080 was sold at $385,000.

The machine itself was housed in a number of 19 inch rack cabinets and the main CPUs consisted of 18 boards of ECL logic. The resulting system was capable of benchmark performances up to 10 MIPS, a very high rating at the time. The PowerNode systems were a very close relative of Gould Concept-32 real-time computer systems running their proprietary MPX real time operating system. Only about two boards differed between PowerNode machines running Unix and the real-time versions running MPX. The most significant of these was the Memory Management board which had virtual memory mapping abilities in the Unix variant but not in the real-time variant.

A smaller model of the PowerNode was also available in the form of the Gould PowerNode 6032 and 6040 single processor systems and 6080 dual CPU which achieved a 7 MIPS performance similar to the contemporary DEC VAX-11/780 and VAX-11/785.

The PowerNode series was replaced by the Gould NP-1 series. When Gould was purchased by Nippon Mining, the computer division was divested on the instructions of the US Government for National Security concerns and became part of Encore Computer.
