= Clevite =

Ohio-based manufacturing company

For the radioactive mineral, see Cleveite.

Clevite, Inc. was a Cleveland, Ohio based manufacturing company, founded as the Cleveland Graphite Bronze Company. The company was a leading producer of Babbit bearings and a significant US government defense contractor. The bearings were licensed in Britain to Vandervell Products Ltd; W. A. Robotham of Rolls-Royce said that "it was an exceedingly difficult task for Tony Vandervell ... knowing the American company well".

In 1952 the Cleveland Graphite Bronze Company absorbed the Brush Development Company and Brush Labs in a merger. In 1953 it acquired 51% of Transistor Products Inc., and with other acquisitions such as the German Intermetall in 1955 (a company founded in 1952 by pioneering German physicist and developer of the first "European" transistor Herbert Mataré, and subsequently sold to telecommunications giant ITT in 1965) developed a semiconductor division.

By 1959, over one-third of Clevite's sales were in electronics, split over four units: Clevite Transistor Prods.; Brush Instruments; Clevite Electronic Components; and Clevite Ordnance. Clevite won defense contracts for some of its products and opened a new ordnance plant in 1967. Clevite purchased Shockley Semiconductor Laboratory in 1960 and continued operating it until selling it (again to ITT as it had done with Intermetall) in 1968.

In 1969, Clevite was acquired by Gould-National Batteries, a firm one-quarter its size. It adopted the Gould name in the hopes of having better brand recognition in the marketplace.
