= Dietz Computer Systems =

German minicomputer manufacturer

- Industry: Computer manufacturing
- Founded: 1951; 75 years ago in Mülheim, Germany
- Founder: Heinrich Dietz
- Defunct: 1993

Dietz Computer Systems was a German minicomputer manufacturer with its main office in Mülheim an der Ruhr, Germany.

The systems were used for industrial and business data processing, as well as for technical and scientific purposes. The popular computer-aided design software, Technovision, ran on the systems produced by Dietz, this being the result of Dietz's earlier acquisition of CAD expertise from a Switzerland-based company.

After attempts to run the software on Dietz 600 systems, Technovision was first deployed on the Perkin-Elmer 3200 series, successor models to the Interdata 7/32 and 8/32, and employed Tektronix vector graphics terminals. The T2000 was a two-dimensional CAD system, whereas the T3000 was a two- and three-dimensional CAD product. After the acquisition of Dietz by Norsk Data, the products were migrated to run on the ND-500 series, also employing "vector refresh" (or refresh tube) displays, but adding support for colour raster displays.
