= Superminicomputer =

Historical computer form factor

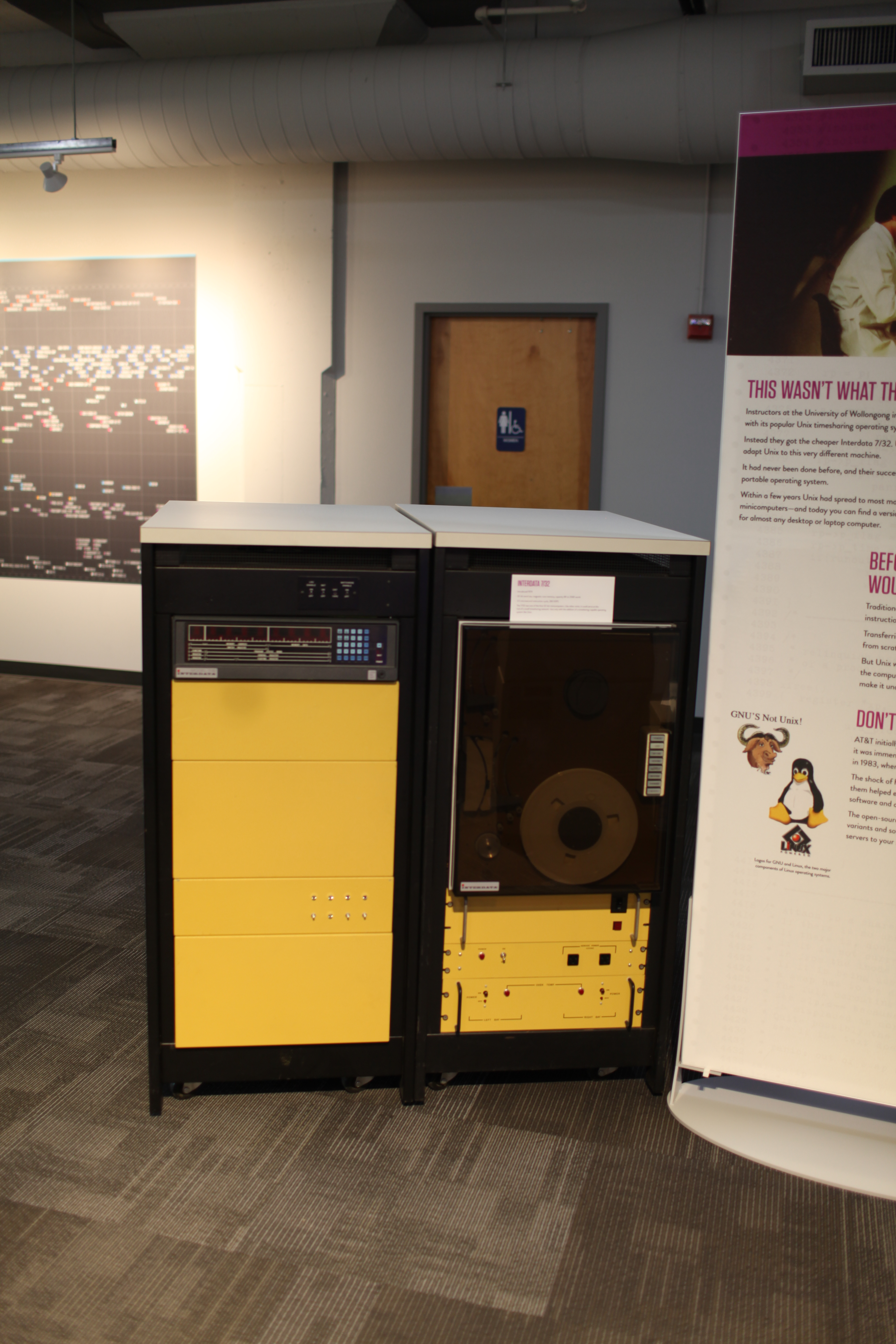
A superminicomputer (Interdata 7/32) preserved in a museum

A superminicomputer, colloquially supermini, is a high-end minicomputer. The term is used to distinguish the emerging 32-bit architecture midrange computers introduced in the mid to late 1970s from the classical 16-bit systems that preceded them. The development of these computers was driven by the need of applications to address larger memory. The term midicomputer had been used earlier to refer to these systems. Virtual memory was often an additional criteria that was considered for inclusion in this class of system. The computational speed of these machines was significantly greater than the 16-bit minicomputers and approached the performance of small mainframe computers. The name has at times been described as a "frivolous" term created by "marketeers" that lacks a specific definition. Describing a class of system has historically been seen as problematic: "In the computer kingdom, taxonomic classification of equipment is more of a black art than a science." There is some disagreement about which systems should be included in this class. The origin of the name is uncertain.

As technology improved rapidly the distinction between minicomputer and superminicomputer performance blurred. Companies that sold mainframe computers began to offer machines in the same price and performance range as superminicomputers. By the mid-1980s microprocessors with the hardware architecture of superminicomputers were used to produce scientific and engineering workstations. The minicomputer industry then declined through the early 1990s. The term is now considered obsolete but still remains of interest for students/researchers of computer history.

== Notable companies ==
Notable manufacturers of superminicomputers in 1980 included: Digital Equipment Corporation, Perkin-Elmer, and Prime Computer. Other makers of systems included SEL/Gould and Data General. Four years later there were about a dozen companies producing a significant number of superminicomputers.

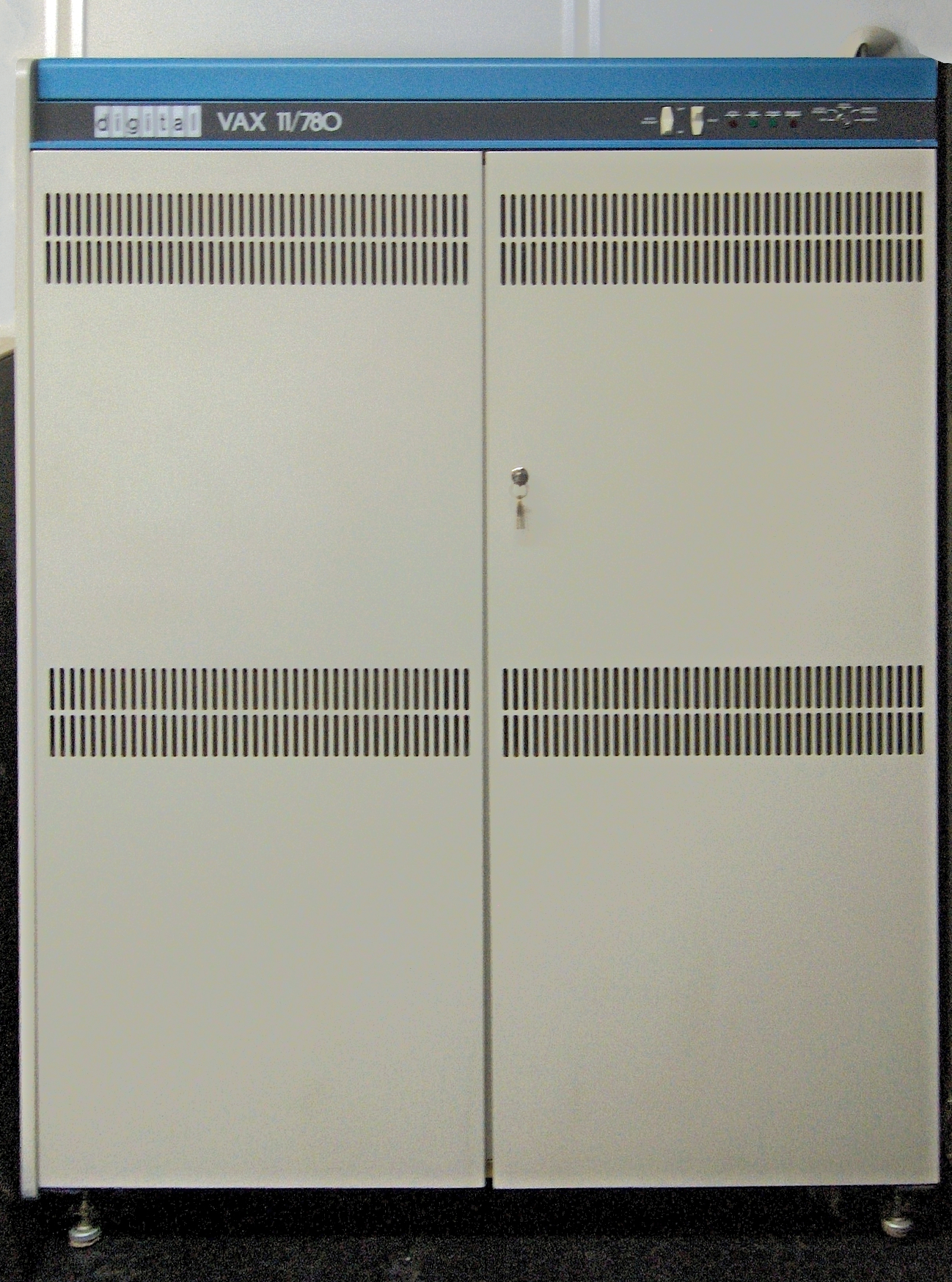
DEC VAX-11/780 superminicomputer

Companies and percentage of the superminicomputer market in 1985
Company	Percent
International Business Machines (IBM)	41.9
Digital Equipment Corporation (DEC)	27.6
Data General	6.0
Prime Computer	5.6
Perkin-Elmer, formerly Interdata	3.4
Wang Laboratories	3.4
Gould, formerly SEL	2.6
Hewlett-Packard	2.2
Honeywell	2.2
Harris Computer Systems	1.7
(other)	3.4

Perkin-Elmer spun off their Data Systems Group in 1985 to form Concurrent Computer Corporation which continued making these systems. Nixdorf Computer, Norsk Data, and Toshiba also produced systems.

== Significant superminicomputers ==
- Interdata 7/32, 1974
- Digital Equipment Corporation VAX-11/780, 1978 (Note: The VAX-11/780 was the standard by which the performance of other supermincomputers and small mainframes were compared.)
- Prime Computer 750, 1979
- Data General Eclipse MV/8000, 1980 (Note: The design engineering of the Data General Eclipse MV/8000 was chronicled in The Soul of a New Machine by Tracy Kidder, a 1981 Pulitzer Prize winning book.)
- IBM 4361, 1983
- AT&T 3B20D, 1984
- IBM 9370, 1987
