= Interdata =

Minicomputer company

- Industry: Technology
- Founded: 1966; 60 years ago
- Fate: Purchased by Perkin-Elmer and later known as Concurrent Computer Corporation
- Headquarters: Oceanport, New Jersey
- Key people: Daniel Sinnott
- Products: 16-bit and 32-bit minicomputers

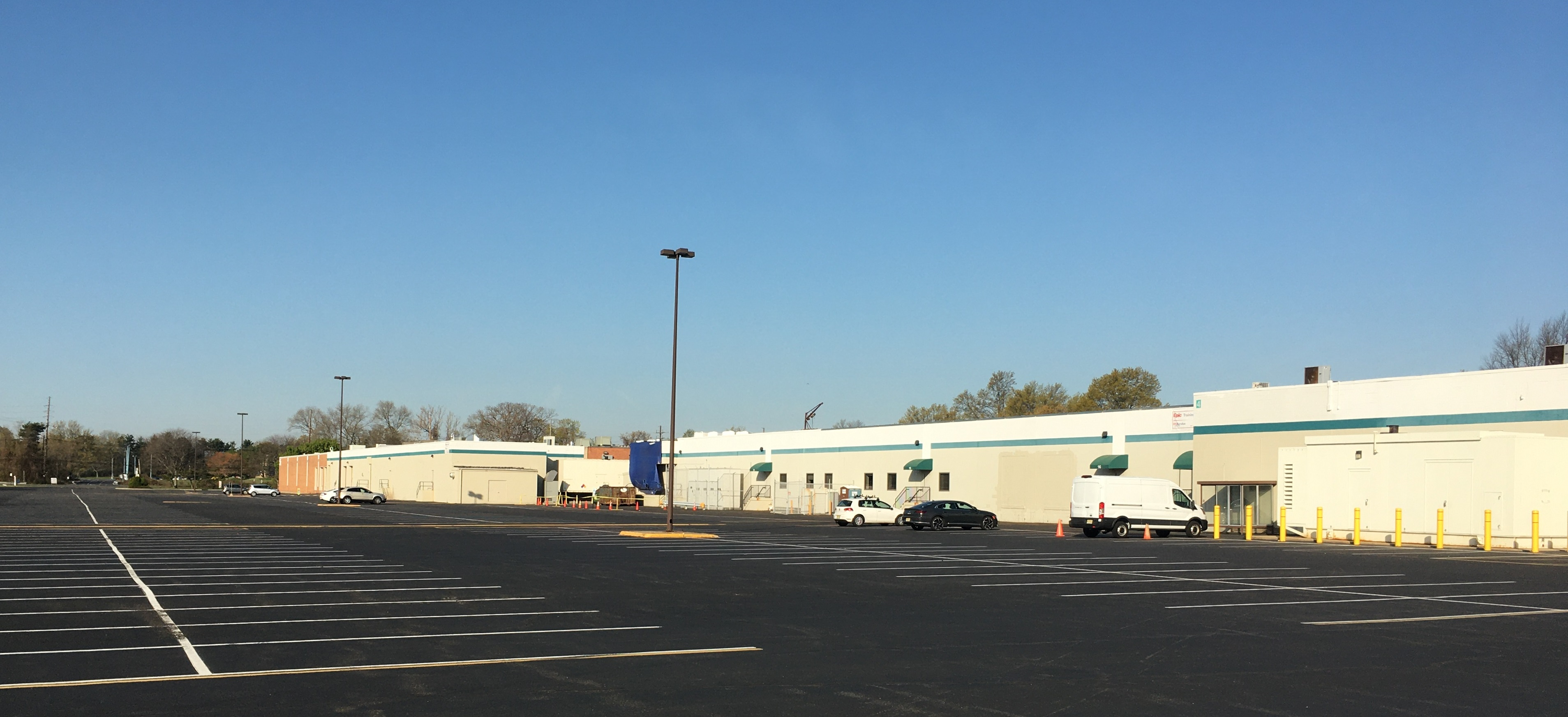
Interdata's offices and manufacturing facility in Oceanport, New Jersey (here seen in 2022), consisted of four interconnected buildings that were constructed from the 1960s through 1983.

Interdata, Inc., was a computer company, founded in 1966 by a former Electronic Associates engineer, Daniel Sinnott, and was based in Oceanport, New Jersey. The company produced a line of 16- and 32-bit minicomputers that were loosely based on the IBM 360 instruction set architecture but at a cheaper price. In 1974, it produced one of the first 32-bit minicomputers, the Interdata 7/32. The company then used the parallel processing approach, which uses more than one computer processor simultaneously to perform work on a problem. This helped in making real-time computing a reality.

Some real-time applications Interdata computers were used for included: Core Protection Calculator, used in some later Combustion Engineering designed nuclear power plants; lottery systems manufactured by GTech; the NexRad weather radar system. Many companies used them for internal high speed laboratory data capture, such as United Technologies Research Center in East Hartford, Connecticut wind tunnel, General Electric R&D in Schenectady, New York, and Perkin-Elmer in Connecticut (which later acquired Interdata).

The 16-bit computers had several operating systems, such as the Basic Operating System (BOSS), Disk Operating System (DOS), Real Time Operating System (RTOS), and OS/16. The 32-bit computers had OS/32. The assembly language could generate series independent object code. Later, as with Gould, SEL, Modcomp and other real time competitors, they offered a 32-bit time sharing system called MTM (Multi Terminal Monitor).

== Acquisitions ==
In 1973, Interdata was purchased by Perkin-Elmer Corporation, a Connecticut-based producer of scientific instruments for $63.6 million. Interdata was already making $19 million in annual sales but this merger made Perkin-Elmer's annual sales rise to over $200 million. Interdata then became the basis for Perkin-Elmer's Data Systems Group. In 1985, the computing division of Perkin-Elmer was spun off as Concurrent Computer Corporation.

== List of products ==
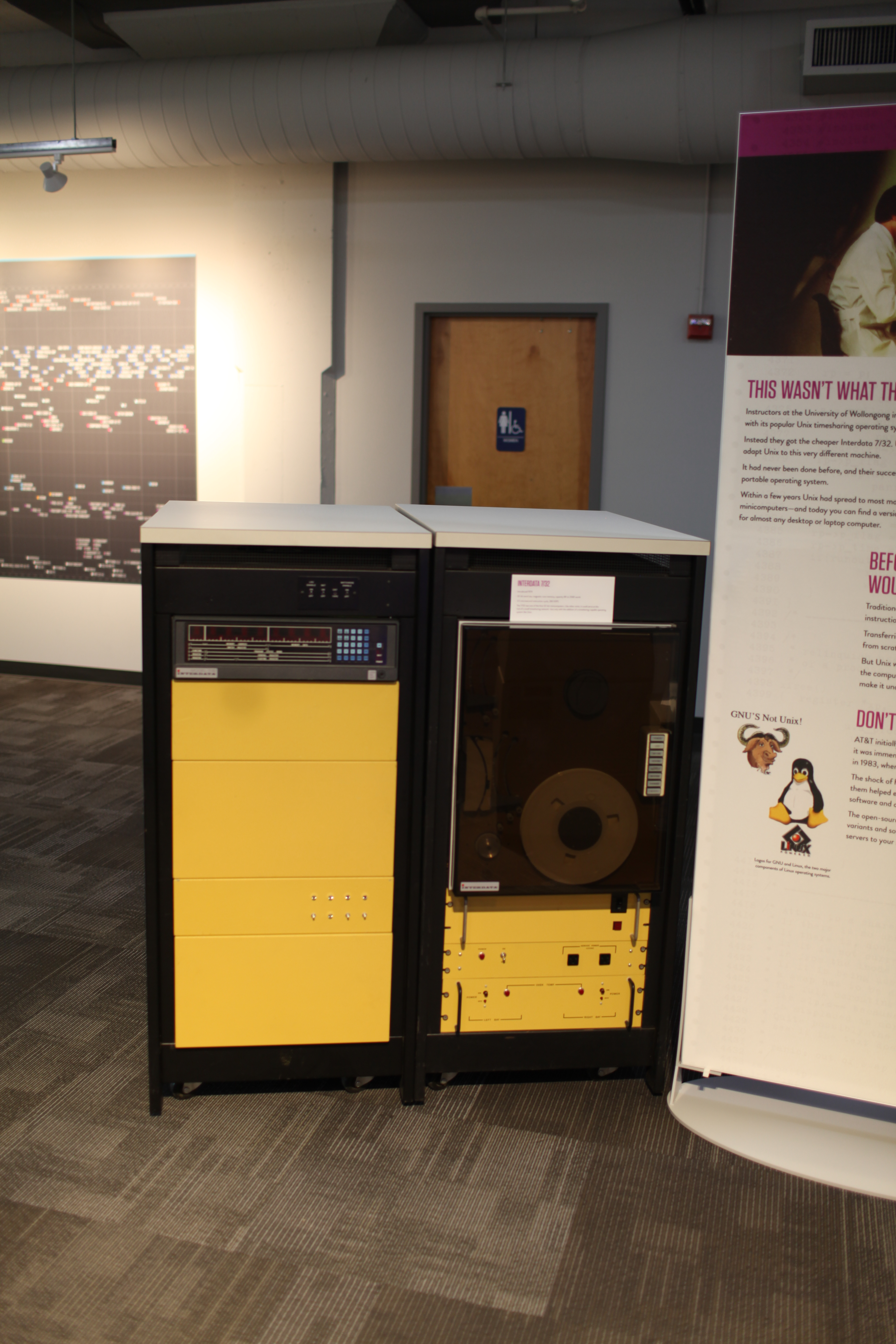
Interdata 7/32

- Interdata Model 1 – 1970
- Interdata Model 3 – 1967
- Interdata 4 (autoload, floating point)
- Interdata 5 (list processing, microcoded automatic I/O channel)
- Interdata 70 (1971), 74 (1973), 80 (1971), 85 (Writable Control Store, 1973)
- Interdata 50, 55 (Communications systems)
- Interdata 5/16, 6/16, 7/16 (1974)
- Interdata 8/16, 8/16e (double precision floating point, extended memory)
- Interdata RD-800 and RD-850 – 1975
- Interdata 7/32 – 1974
- Interdata 8/32 – 1975
- Perkin-Elmer 3205, 3210, 3220, 3230, 3240, 3250, 3280

A simulator is available: https://simh.trailing-edge.com/interdata.html
