= General Automation =

General Automation, Inc.
- Type: Public
- Founded: 1968
- Headquarters: Anaheim, California
- Key people: Larry Goshorn and Burt Yale, co-founders
- Products: Minicomputers

GA General Automation was an American company, founded in 1968 by Burt Yale and Larry Goshorn (a former marketing executive and a salesman from Honeywell), which manufactured minicomputers and industrial controllers. General Automation was originally located in Orange, California. In the late 1970s, GA relocated to Anaheim, California.

In 1971, Ray Noorda, the future CEO of Novell, joined GA as executive vice-president. In 1971 General Automation increased its sales to $10.6 million and showed its first profit of $3,000. In 1972, sales increased to $16 million with net income of $1.56 million. By 1973 sales jumped to $30.4 million.

In 1990, GA reported a loss of $221,000 on revenues of $39,248,000.

In 1994, General Automation announced it would be relocating from Anaheim to Irvine. It announced it would be phasing-out its manufacturing operations but would retain its 50 employees.

By 2002, General Automation was doing business under the name GA eXpress, Inc. In 2003, GA eXpress filed a Form 8-K with the SEC stating it would go into receivership.

== Products ==
- SPC-12 (Jan 1968)

- Priced at $6400 and claiming $4,000 worth of free options
- Totally integrated, binary, parallel, single-address processor
- 8-bit data and 12-bit address
- 4,096 words (8-bit bytes) of memory with a 2.2 microsecond cycle time
- Shared command concept that permits the SPC-12s 8-bit memory to handle 12-bit instructions.
- Features included a real-time clock, memory expandable to 16K bytes, a teletype interface, a control panel and a priority interrupt

- SPC-8 (Nov 1968)
- GA 18/30 (June 1968, IBM 1800 and IBM 1130-compatible)
- SPC-16/30, /50 & /70 (November 1971)
- SPC-16/40, /45, /65 & /85 (January 1972)
- LSI-12/16 (January 1974)

These computers were initially produced with silicon on sapphire circuit technology provided by Rockwell International but yield problems caused a switch to conventional ICs by 1975.

- GA 16/110 and 16/120 (December 1976)

These SPC-16 compatible computers were based on a two-chip microprocessor supplied by Synertek

- GA 16/220 (July 1978)
- GA 16/330
- GA 16/440
- GA 16/460
- GA Zebra 1700/1750

Introduced in 1985, a Motorola 68000 computer running Xenix or Pick Operating System

- Parallel Computers, Inc. – fault-tolerant supermicro/minicomputer based on Unix, acquired 1987, sold 1988
