= Interdata 7/32 and 8/32 =

32-bit minicomputers

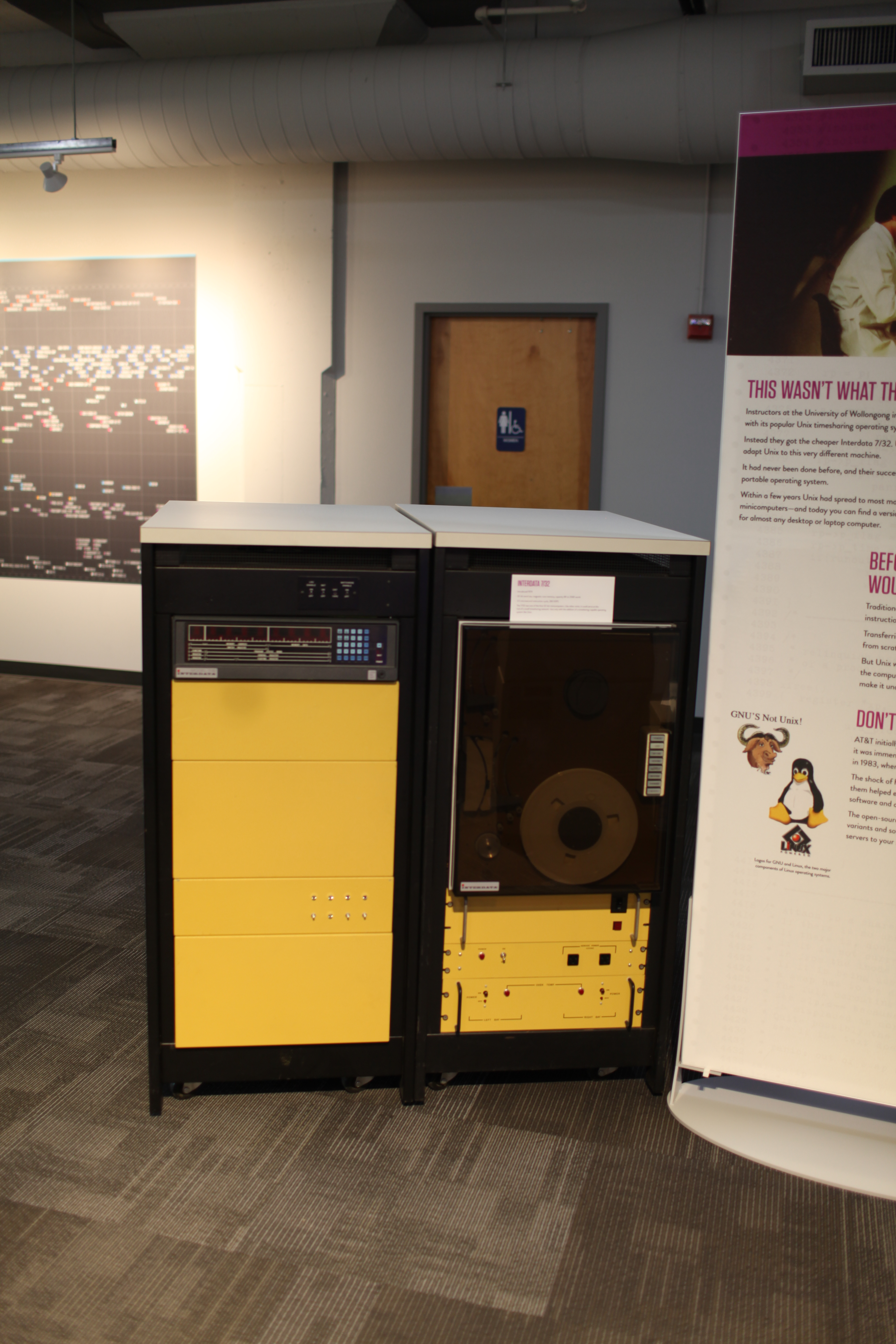
The Interdata 7/32 at the Living Computer Museum

The Model 7/32 and Model 8/32 were 32-bit minicomputers introduced by Perkin-Elmer after they acquired Interdata, Inc., in 1973. The 7/32 and 8/32 are primarily remembered for being the first 32-bit minicomputers under $10,000.

The 8/32, introduced in March 1975, was a more powerful machine than the 7/32, augmented by a number of options including the notable feature of a writable control store, allowing user-programmable microcode to be employed, a floating-point processor, and a high-speed data handling extension. It increased the memory bus width to 32 bits from 16, although it maintained a 16-bit input/output bus to utilise existing controllers and to avoid the costly process of developing "double-wide" controllers.

== Background ==
After the commercial success of the microcoded IBM System/360 series of mainframe computers, various startup companies arrived on the scene to bring microcode technology to the smaller minicomputers. Among these companies were Prime Computer, Microdata, and Interdata. Interdata used microcode to define an architecture that was heavily influenced by the IBM System/360 instruction set. The DOS-type real-time serial/multitasking operating system was called OS/32.

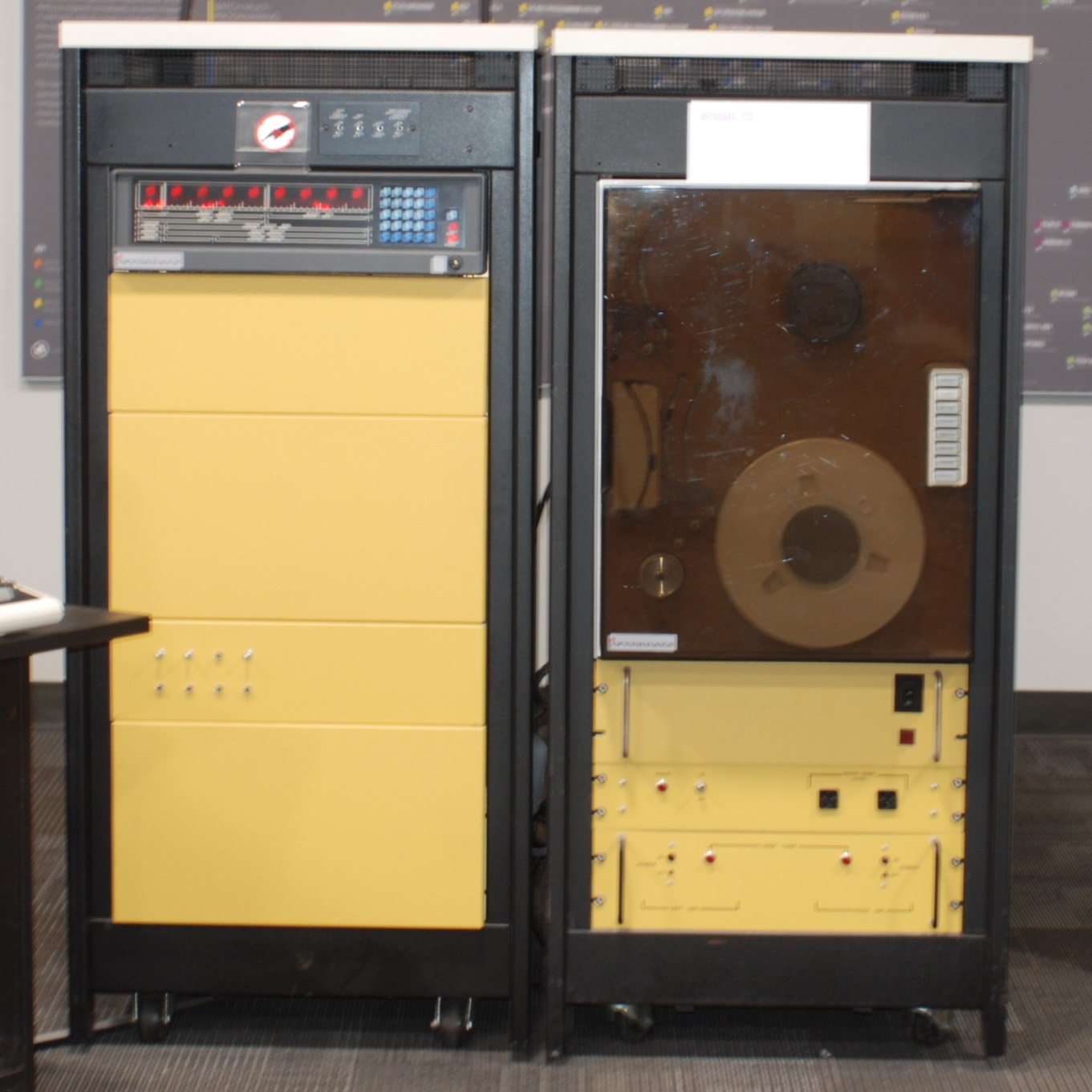
Another view of the Living Computers Museum + Labs example

== Differences between the 7/32 and 8/32 ==
The Model 7/32 and 8/32 both provided full-word data processing and direct addressing up to 1 MB of memory through the use of 32-bit general registers and a comprehensive instruction set. Both systems used a memory cycle time of 750 ns, but the 8/32 was able to operate at a 300 ns "effective cycle time" through the use of two "instruction lookahead stacks" and interleaved memory.

Other architectural differences include the following:

- General register sets – The 7/32 has 2 sets while the 8/32 can have either 2 or 8.
- I/O priority levels – The 7/32 has none but the 8/32 can have up to 3.
- Writeable control store – The 7/32 does not have one and the 8/32 does.
- Speed – On average the 8/32 is 2.5x faster than the 7/32.

== Usage ==
The 7/32 and 8/32 became the computers of choice in large scale embedded systems, such as FFT machines used in real-time seismic analysis, CAT scanners, and flight simulator systems. They were also often used as non-IBM peripherals in IBM networks, serving the role of HASP workstations and spooling systems, so called RJE (Remote Job Entry) stations. For example, the computers behind the first Space Shuttle simulator consisted of thirty-six 32-bit minis inputting and/or outputting data to networked mainframe computers (both IBM and UNIVAC), all in real-time.

The 8/32 was used in the Lunar and Planetary Laboratory, Department of Planetary Sciences at the University of Arizona for research purposes.

The 8/32 was also employed by Mathematical Applications Group, Inc. (MAGI) to produce the vast majority of the 3D computer-generated imagery (CGI) in the 1982 film Tron. While CGI had been used during the 1970s for minor segments of film work (such as titles), Tron was the first film by a major producer that made extensive use of CGI.

== Operating systems ==
The standard operating system for the 7/32 and 8/32 was Interdata's OS/32. At MIT, by 1976, Interdata computers were being used by the Architecture Machine Group and Joint Computer Facility at MIT, using the FORTRAN and PL/I programming languages.

Unix was ported to the platform in 1977 by two groups, working independently; to the 7/32 at Wollongong University, and to the 8/32 at Bell Labs, making the 32-bit Interdata machines the first non-PDP computers to run Unix (See V6 Unix § portability). Bell chose the 8/32 for its port because the Interdata computer was as different from the DEC PDP-11 as possible. Perkin-Elmer distributed the Wollongong Unix port as Perkin-Elmer Edition 7, the first version of Unix supported by a computer company.

By 1979, researchers at the Architecture Machine Group created an operating system modelled on Multics called Magic 6, which featured the Multics concepts of pages, segments and dynamic linking, but had no security checks.

== Emulation ==
SIMH, the historical computer emulator project, includes emulators for the 7/32 and 8/32, as well as their 16-bit minicomputers.

The Living Computers Museum + Labs had a 7/32 on display with attached teletype.
