= Systems Engineering Laboratories =

Computer manufacturer

- Industry: Computers
- Founded: 1959; 67 years ago in Fort Lauderdale, Florida, United States
- Defunct: 1981; 45 years ago
- Fate: Acquired by Gould Electronics
- Successor: Gould Computer Systems Division

Systems Engineering Laboratories (also called SEL) was a manufacturer of minicomputers in Fort Lauderdale, Florida. It was one of the first 32-bit realtime computer system manufacturers. Realtime computers are used for process control and monitoring.

== History ==
Systems Engineering Laboratories was founded and incorporated in Fort Lauderdale, Florida in 1959, and were involved in the beginning of the breakout of minicomputers from 16-bit to larger architectures, with a 24-bit model in 1966.

SEL was purchased by Gould Electronics in 1981 and was operated essentially unchanged as the Gould Computer Systems Division (CSD). The parent company was acquired by Nippon Mining in 1988, but as part of the U.S. government approval of the deal, Nippon Mining was required to divest the Gould divisions that did work for the Department of Defense, including the Computer Systems Division. Later, in 1989, Encore Computer Corporation (about 250 employees) bought the computer division (about 2500 employees) from Nippon Mining. Parts of Encore were sold off over the years, with the last major spin-off being their Storage Products Group, sold to Sun Microsystems in 1997. This left the company consisting primarily of their real-time group (the original SEL core) and returned to this business niche after renaming themselves Encore Real Time Computing. In 2002, Compro Computer Services, Inc. (a former service competitor, and later service partner) obtained SEL/Gould/Encore real-time technological assets through its acquisition of Encore Real Time Computing, Inc., and continues support of the legacy SelBUS-based product line as far back as the 32/55 and offers an upgrade path using the Legacy Computer Replacement System (LCRS) hardware simulator.

Compro Computer Services, Inc continue trading as Encore in Europe, COMPRO continues the tradition of long-term product support by offering replacement solutions (e.g., the Legacy Computer Replacement System, or LCRS) that emphasize backward-compatibility coupled with future-proofing. Gould (as well as its primary competitors MASSCOMP, Harris Computer Systems and Concurrent Computer Corporation) were driven into the ground by general purpose microprocessor Unix designs such as those by Sun and SGI.

== Computer products ==
=== SEL 800 series ===
SEL's first computers the 810 and 840 use all silicon monolithic integrated circuits. The 810 has a 16-bit word size while the 840 has a 24-bit word size. Core memory for both is in 4096 word increments up to 32,768 words with a 1.75 microsecond machine full cycle time. They featured a complete software package for real-time applications and a FORTRAN package for off-line scientific computation. Options included external disk or drum storage and any "standard" peripheral.

The 810A and 840A are somewhat enhanced versions of the earlier models.

The 810B has a 750 nanosecond full cycle time with an 8K work memory expandable to 32K.

The multiprocessing 840MP can be configured for up to three CPUs with 32k 24-bit words each and sharing a 64K core bank. It uses the 840A software and peripherals.

=== SEL 32 series ===
In 1975, the Model 32/55 computer was introduced along with a new bus architecture called the SelBUS. This system was one of the industry's first true 32-bit superminicomputers along with the PerkinElmer 8/32.

The bus speed was 26.6 megabytes per second, which was a record at the time of its introduction. The CPU of the 32/55 was composed of three wire-wrapped boards bolted together. The use of a bus instead of a wire-wrapped backplane simplified manufacturing, lowered costs, and made system enhancements easier. Multilayer printed circuit boards were introduced with the 32/75 about a year later, and single-board CPUs were introduced as the 32/27 shortly thereafter. Core memory was replaced by semiconductor memory.

The SEL 32 series became extremely popular in many technical markets such as aircraft simulation, oil exploration, electric power system control, and the beginnings of computer animation. Gould/SEL computers were used to animate the opening sequence for Steven Spielberg's television series Amazing Stories.

=== SEL 32/x7 and 6000-9000 series ===
In the early 1980s, SEL introduced a system based on emitter-coupled logic (ECL) technology code named the Thunderbird. Its official marketing name became the Concept series, consisting of three models: the low-end Concept 32/67, and the refrigerator-sized Concept 32/87 and 32/97. These ran the company's proprietary MPX-32 operating system. With the additional of virtual memory hardware, the 32/67 and 32/97 models took on the designations of Powernode 6000 and Powernode 9000, with several variants of each available. These ran UTX-32, Gould's version of Unix based on a BSD 4.2 kernel developed by Gould's UNIX development centre in Urbana-Champaign (IL) to support multiprocessor systems. The Powernode 9080 was a symmetrical dual processor system, with both processors having full access to memory and the I/O bus, and capable of being booted up from either processor. It was the first such commercially available system to run any version of Unix.

The CPU for these system ballooned to about a dozen boards because of the low-density ECL chip footprint. As a result, CPUs could only be placed at each end of the SELbus, limiting computer systems to two CPUs. It had modular cache memory that could be upgraded. The ECL circuitry consumed huge amount of current at a very low voltage; the cabinets of the larger models contained extra rack space which held stacks of 400-amp power supplies, and heavy-gauge wiring leading to the backplane. In the mid-1990s, the RSX computer board featured RISC processing capabilities and high speed 75 ns static RAM design (essentially an all-cache design) while maintaining complete binary compatibility with existing programs.

Gould/SEL's "High Speed Data interface" or HSD was considered an industry standard in the process control industry.

=== Other ===
One of Gould's primary contributions to the real-time computing world was its "Reflective Memory" technology which allowed up to eight computers to share memory at a very high speed.

When Encore Computer acquired Gould's Computer Systems division, the new Encore switched to using Motorola 88100 series of chips and a Unix-based OS. They built a small Unix based system known as the Encore-91 which included a number of RT extensions including a "micro-MPX environment."

Encore used the real-time reflective memory design from Gould along with their 88100 based systems and Umax OS to create a line of high-density storage devices. Known as the Infinity-90 product these acted as large SANs for Unix, Windows and mainframe computers with data sharing capabilities. In 1997 Encore sold this product line to Sun Microsystems where it was marketed as the A7000. It was not very successful and eventually canceled by Sun. About 200 Encore employees went to Sun in this exchange.

Because of the long-life support requirements of nuclear plants and military flight simulators, there are still companies in existence today providing support and parts for Gould/SEL systems.

== Software ==
SEL had a proprietary operating system called Real Time Monitor (RTM) which, although extremely fast, had limited user interface. It supported a console for command entry, and would support up to 16 users via the ALIM interface. When the SEL 32 systems were introduced, SEL created another operating system called MPX-32 which supported multiprocessing and multiple users. Later, in the early 1980s, SEL adopted the Unix operating system.

As "Gould CSD" (Computer System Division) then introduced the UTX-32 Unix-based OS that included both BSD and System V characteristics. At a time when there was a "religious war" between BSD and System V advocates, Gould developed this "dual universe" system that contained nearly all of the features of both BSD 4.2 and System V.4. The user made the selection of which environment would be used by setting a few shell variables. (However, clever programmers soon discovered that by customizing search paths, they could mix utilities, system calls and libraries from both environments.) A special secure version, designated UTX-32S, was one of the first Unix based systems to receive NSA's C2 security level certification.

While SEL did not provide a BASIC language for the 810 series, Brigham Young University (BYU) instructor Richard Ohran translated Hewlett-Packard's single-user BASIC to the SEL machine in the early 1970s. Ohran's SEL 810 BASIC was later reused for the Sphere 1 microcomputer.

== See also ==
- Encore Computer
- Computer History Museum
- Brochure (July 1971?)
