= Gould Electronics =

Former American Conglomerate company

Gould Electronics GmbH
- Industry: Semiconductors
- Founded: 1928; 98 years ago
- Defunct: 2014; 12 years ago
- Fate: closed by its corporate owner, JX Nippon Mining & Metals
- Headquarters: Eichstetten, Germany
- Area served: United States, Asia, Europe
- Owner: JX Nippon Mining & Metals
- Parent: JX Holdings
- Website: gould.com at the Wayback Machine (archived 2012-02-04)

Gould Electronics Inc. was a manufacturer of electronics and batteries that branched into other fields before being partially absorbed in 1988 by Nippon Mining (now JX Holdings) and closed by them in 2014. The company had its origins in several battery manufacturers who were consolidated in the period under the ownership of the National Battery Co.

== History ==
Gould had its origin in a number of companies, including both the Gould Storage Battery Corporation (founded 1899) and the National Lead Battery Company (founded 1920 in Saint Paul, Minnesota). Gould Storage Battery had been founded by Charles A. Gould and was a 100% owned subsidiary of his Gould Coupler Company based in Depew, New York. During the World War I the company along with Exide had manufactured batteries for US Navy submarines. During the 1920s they would pivot into producing batteries for the automotive industry.

In 1928 the National Lead Battery company reincorporated in Delaware as the National Battery Co. and two years later bought the Gould Storage Battery Company for $225,000. In 1947 National Battery acquired the Storage Battery Division of Philco and merged it into its Gould Storage Battery subsidiary. In 1950 the company renamed itself as Gould-National Batteries, Inc. In 1969 Gould-National merged with Clevite, this resulted in the renaming of the company to Gould Inc. and the entering into the semiconductor industry. Gould Inc. would move its headquarters from St. Paul's to Rolling Meadows, Illinois after the merger. Having acquired Systems Engineering Laboratories, Gould became involved in the superminicomputer computer business.

From 1977 to the mid-1980s the company owned the Modicon brand of programmable logic controller, today owned by Schneider Electric. This was in a phase where the company became a mini-conglomerate, with a diverse portfolio of industrial interests. In 1983 the original Battery business which had made up nearly the entirety of the business before diversification in the late 1960s was sold to a group of investors. This would become GNB Batteries Inc. (the initials based on the original Gould-National Batteries name) and would be acquired by Pacific Dunlop in 1987 before finally becoming part of Exide in 2000.

In 1985, Gould, Inc. employed 21,000 worldwide and had sales of 1.4 billion, most of which came from its electrical and electronics products and components, and its defense systems.

Gould's non-defense businesses were acquired in 1988 by Nippon Mining (now JX Holdings). As part of the U.S. government approval of the 1988 deal, Nippon Mining was required to divest the Gould divisions then doing work for the Department of Defense, including the Computer Systems Division. Later, in 1989, Encore Computer Corporation (about 250 employees) bought the computer division (about 2500 employees) from Nippon Mining.

Gould would report losses over the next couple of years and in 1993 Nippon Mining decided to liquidate Gould Inc. and to divide the assets between two new companies, namely Gould Electronics Inc. (Copper Foil manufacture for Electronics industry) and Gould Instrument Systems Inc. (test and measurement equipment). GIS Inc. was subsequently purchased by ThermoSpectra for $25.6 million in May 1995.

At some point, the company moved headquarters to Eichstetten, Germany.

=== Sports sponsorship ===
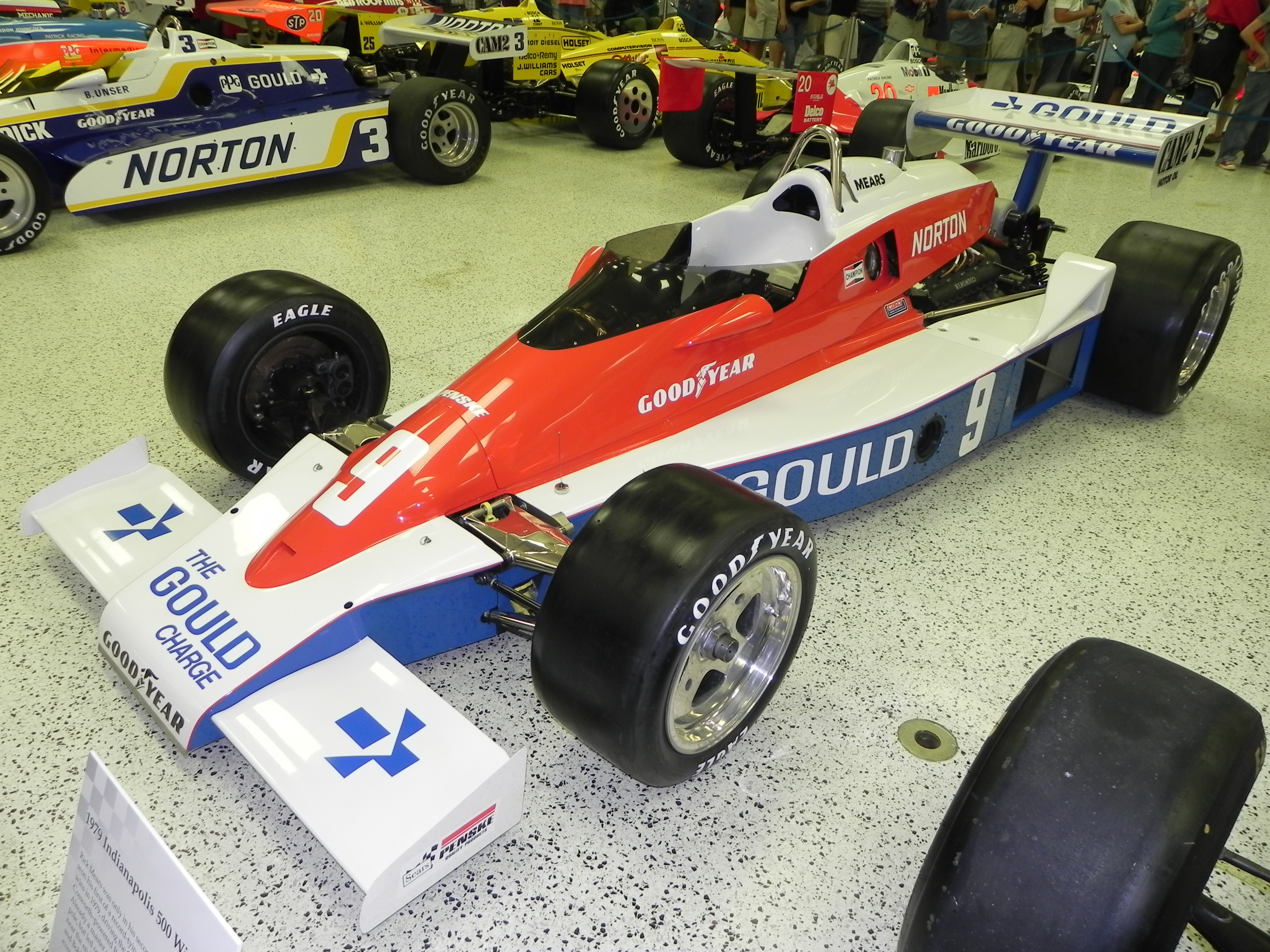
The Gould sponsored IndyCar used to win the 1979 Indianapolis 500

During the late 1970s, Gould served as a sponsor for Penske Racing in American open wheel racing. This included being the primary sponsor of the winning car of the 1979 Indianapolis 500, driven by eventual four-time "500" winner Rick Mears.

=== Closure ===
In July 2014, Gould's then current corporate parent, JX Nippon Mining & Metals Corporation (a part of JX Holdings), announced that it would be closing down the company as a part of JX Nippon Metals & Mining's restructuring, involving closing down several facilities in Japan, the Philippines, and in Germany, where Gould was headquartered. The restructuring was in response to, according to their press release about Gould's closure, "a shrinking market in Europe, high overcapacity and an ongoing erosion of prices, partly triggered by subsidized manufacturers from China and other Asian countries."

Gould is the current owner of a lead-contaminated parcel of land in Throop, Pennsylvania, which it bought in the early 1980s from the former Marjol Battery and Equipment Company.

The CGI title credits of the 1980s television show Amazing Stories was created using a Gould Powernode 9080 computer.
