= Encore Computer =

Massachusetts computer pioneer

Encore Computer Corporation
- Company type: Public
- Industry: Computer
- Founded: 1983; 42 years ago in Marlborough, Massachusetts
- Founder: Kenneth Fisher; Gordon Bell; Henry Burkhardt III
- Defunct: 1998; 27 years ago
- Fate: Acquired by Gores Technology Group; subsequently sold to Compro Computer Services
- Successor: Encore Real-Time Computing

Encore Computer Corporation was an American computer company independently active from 1983 to 1997. Based in Marlborough, Massachusetts, the company was an early pioneer in the parallel computing market. Although offering several system designs beginning in 1985, Encore was never as well known as other companies in this field such as Pyramid Technology, Alliant, and the most similar systems Sequent and FLEX.

Encore was founded in 1983 by: Kenneth Fisher, former CEO of Prime Computer; Gordon Bell, an engineering vice president from Digital Equipment Corporation responsible for the development of the VAX; and, Henry Burkhardt III, co-founder of Data General and Kendall Square Research. Their goal was to build massively parallel machines from commodity processors; their first design, the Multimax, was released in September 1985. This was one of the first commercial designs to make use of bus snooping, allowing many processors to share the same memory efficiently.

== History ==
In 1988, Encore purchased the former Systems Engineering Laboratories (SEL) from Nippon Mining. SEL, founded in 1961, built high-performance electronics systems for industrial monitoring and control purposes, and was purchased by Gould Electronics in 1980; Gould was in turn purchased by Nippon Mining in 1988.

SEL computers were used in many military flight simulators; because of US government regulations which forbid foreign companies from owning control of companies providing key components of the national defense, Nippon had to sell SEL. Nippon in essence paid Encore to buy the computer division.

Encore then turned, as did most of the market, to RISC-based CPUs. They chose the Motorola 88000, and released the Encore-91 in late 1991, supporting two (9102) or four (9104) CPUs running at 25 MHz. A bottom-up redesign for the new processor led to the Infinity 90 series, starting with the Infinity 90/ES in 1994. The ES supported between 2 and 2,045 Motorola 88110 CPUs running at 50 MHz. Several newer machines in the Infinity 90 series were released, but Encore again found its CPU supplier changing direction as Motorola dropped development of the 88000 series to concentrate on the PowerPC.

Trying again, this time in the high-performance real-time market, Encore turned to the Alpha 21064 to create the Infinity R/T Model 300, which first shipped in late 1994. By this point the massively parallel market was being encroached on by machines made up of large numbers of commodity machines, and Encore released a single-CPU workstation running OSF/1, the Series 90 RT 3000. It was intended to be used either standalone or as a node in a massively parallel machine.

Encore also worked on a modified RISC design known as the RSX. This was intended to operate in two modes, one as a normal CPU node for clusters, and in a CONCEPT/32 compatibility mode, which emulated earlier custom hardware from the real-time side of the company. Encore continues to offer upgrade paths for their earlier systems, some of which date back to 1975.

Parts of the computing side of the company were sold off over the years, with the last major spin-off being their Storage Products Group, sold to Sun Microsystems in 1997.

=== Acquisitions ===
==== Gores Technology Group ====
In 1998, Gores Technology Group acquired Encore, and renamed it "Encore Real-Time Computing". This left the company consisting primarily of their real-time group and the original SEL core, returning to this business niche.

==== Compro Computer Services ====
In 2002, Compro Computer Services acquired Encore Real-Time Computing, although most of the non-US offices still operate under the Encore name. Compro continues its support of SelBUS-based SEL, Gould, and Encore Real-Time Computing products, and offers an upgrade path with the Legacy Computer Replacement System (LCRS) hardware simulator.

A sample Encore Multimax system donated from the Naval Postgraduate School is in storage at the Computer History Museum.

== Specifications ==
The original Multimax could support from one to ten pairs of 10 MHz National Semiconductor NS32032 processors, a 32-bit CISC design similar to that of the Motorola 68000. Subsequent Multimax models supported NS32332 and NS32532 processors at higher clock rates. The last National-based Multimax was the model 500 offered in 1989. All models ran the user's choice of BSD or System V Unix or Mach. All three operating systems were modified for parallel computing. However, soon after the 500's release, National stopped the development of the NS32032 design.
