= DDT (disambiguation) =

DDT, or dichlorodiphenyltrichloroethane, is an insecticide.

DDT may also refer to:

== Sciences ==
- Deflagration to detonation transition, a type of explosion
- DDT (gene)

== Humanities and art ==
- DDT (band) (ДДТ), a rock band from Russia
- D.D.T. (band) a microtonal music group
- Supernaut (Serbian band), formerly known as DDT
- Denkmäler deutscher Tonkunst, a series of editions of German music
- Death Defying Theatre, an Australian theatre company
- Dragostea Din Tei, a single by the Moldovan pop group O-Zone

== Sports ==
- DDT (professional wrestling), a move in professional wrestling
- DDT Pro-Wrestling (originally Dramatic Dream Team), a Japanese professional wrestling promotion

== Technology ==
- Allinea Distributed Debugging Tool, a debugger produced by Allinea primarily for debugging parallel programs
- Dynamic Debugging Technique, a debugger in computer programming
- Data-driven testing, a testing concern in model-based testing

== Other ==
- A transport document for goods shipments to Italy
- Dark Dirigible Titan, a type of Bloon in the Bloons Tower Defense series

== See also ==
- DTT (disambiguation)
