= Mentec =

Computer company focused on DEC's PDP-11

Mentec International Ltd was founded in 1978 and initially focused on the development of monitoring and control software and systems. It was a significant Digital Equipment Corporation (DEC) reseller and OEM in Ireland. Mentec Computer Systems Limited was a subsidiary of Mentec Limited that repackaged PDP-11 processors. Mentec Inc. was a US-based subsidiary of Mentec Limited. In the early 1980s it had a range of remote terminal units based on the SBC/11-21 (Falcon).

Once the DEC J-11 PDP-11 processor chip set became available in 1982 Mentec commenced the design of its first PDP-11 single-board computer, the M70.

In 1994 DEC transferred the PDP-11 operating systems to Mentec Inc.

== Product range ==
=== M70 ===
The M70 was developed between 1982 and 1984. It was a quad Q-bus module based on the J-11 chipset incorporating onboard ECC DRAM, bootstrap EPROMs and 4 serial lines implemented using DEC DC319 DLART chips.

=== M71 ===
The M71 was a version of the M70 intended for process control. It provided for 1/4 or 1 M Byte of ECC DRAM, up to 1/2 MB of EPROM, 4 serial lines (DC-319 DLARTs) and two parallel ports implemented using 8255 chips. It was initially designed by Mentec for use in its own Remote Terminal Units.

=== M80 ===
The M80 was a further development of the M70 but using parity memory and a slightly higher clock rate. It also introduced software configuration via the bootstrap which all but eliminated wire-wrap configuration.

=== M90 ===
This was effectively merely a clock tweaked version of the M80.

=== M100 ===
The M100, a redesign of the 11/93, was the last of Mentec's J-11 based processor boards. It ran the J-11 chipset at 19.66 MHz, and had four on-board serial ports, 1–4 MB of on-board memory, and an optional FPU. The M100 was a somewhat tidied up and faster re-design of the M90.

Some late models incorporated a daughter card with a Xilinx part which replaced the DLARTs and implemented a FIFO to prevent overruns for OEM applications. A small number of late models also incorporated an SRAM daughter card which replaced the on-board DRAM.

=== M11 ===
The M11 was a microcoded implementation of the PDP-11 instruction set done from scratch, Mentec announced, describing it as a processor upgrade board replacement for the M100. It was based around two Texas Instruments TI8832 ALUs and a TI 8818 microsequencer. One of the ALUs was used as the processor ALU while the second was used to implement the memory management unit. An Intel i960 processor was used to load the microcode, perform floating point (in IEEE format) and provide ODT. The 4 DLARTs of the earlier M100 were emulated on a single Xilinx part. All of the memory (both microcode and PDP-11 main memory) was implemented using SRAM. While not of any significant effect in the field it suffered from the fact that it used a large number of microcode controlled drivers onto tri-state buses, which made developing microcode somewhat hazardous.

The M11 design was implemented in VHDL and fully simulated using Mentor Graphics QuickSim II with behavioural language models for both the Q-Bus and console UART. It ran patched versions of the DEC PDP-11/23 CPU diagnostics on the simulator before any hardware was constructed.

=== M1 ===
The M1 was a processor upgrade board, done as an ASIC re-implementation of the M11's implementation of the PDP-11 instruction set. Despite being an ASIC implementation it was also fully microcoded. The M1 used an Atmel 0.85 μm ASIC for 5 V operation.

== PDP-11 operating systems ==
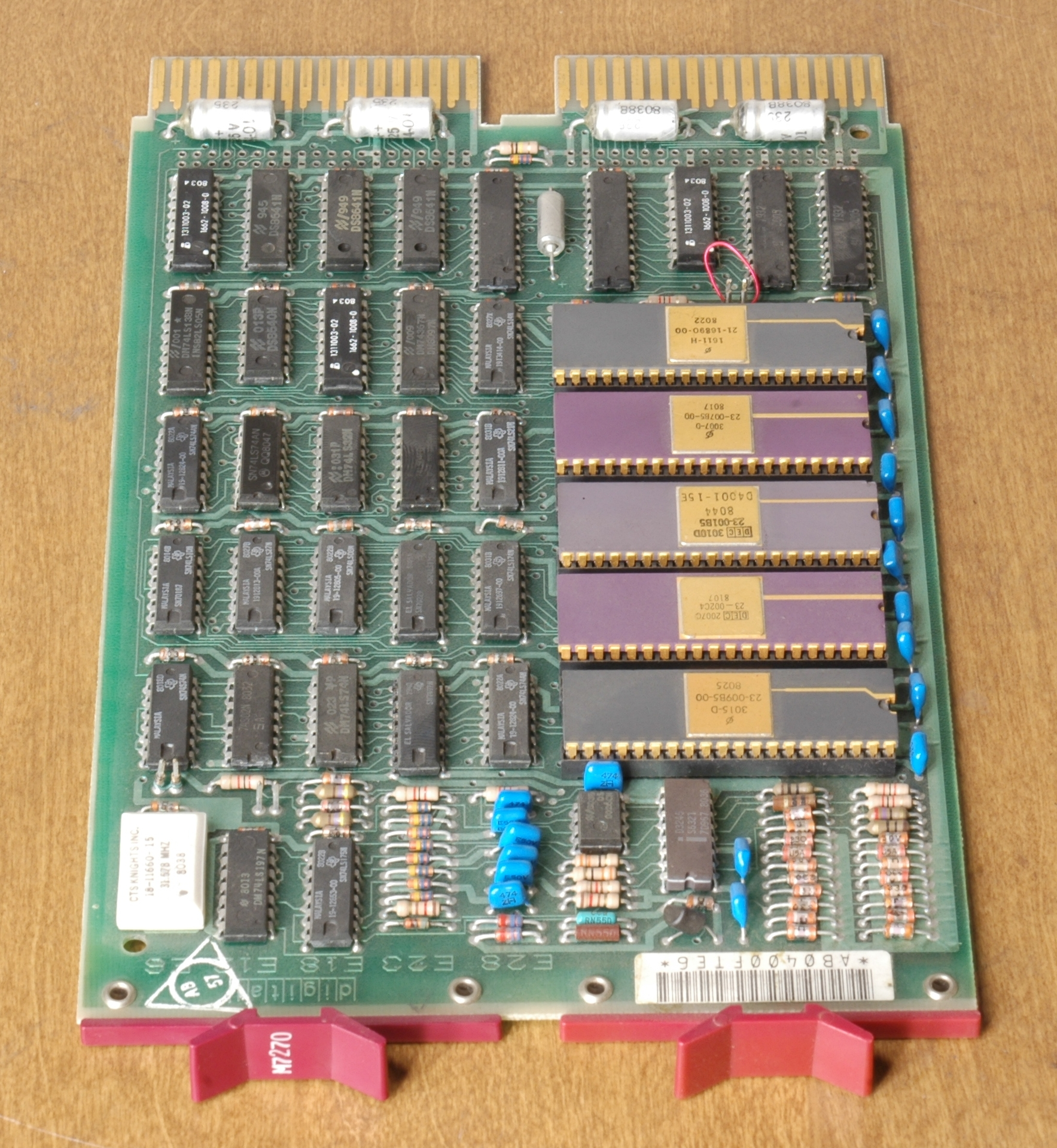
LSI-11/2 16-bit CPU, Q-bus board

=== RSX-11 ===
RSX-11 is a discontinued family of multi-user real-time operating systems for PDP-11 computers created by Digital Equipment Corporation. In widespread use through the late 1970s and early 1980s, RSX-11 was influential in the development of later operating systems such as VMS and Windows NT.

Ownership of RSX-11S, RSX-11M, RSX-11M Plus and Micro/RSX was transferred from DEC to Mentec Inc. in March 1994 as part of a broader agreement. In 2006 Mentec Inc. was declared bankrupt while Mentec Ltd. was acquired by Irish firm Calyx in December 2006. The PDP-11 software, which was owned by Mentec Inc. was then bought by XX2247 LLC, which is the owner of the software today. It is unclear if new commercial licenses are possible to buy at this time. Hobbyists can run RSX-11M (version 4.3 or earlier) and RSX-11M Plus (version 3.0 or earlier) on the SIMH emulator thanks to a free license granted in May 1998 by Mentec Inc.

Legal ownership of RSX-11A, RSX-11B, RSX-11C, RSX-11D, and IAS never changed hands; therefore it passed to Compaq when it acquired DEC in 1998 and then to Hewlett-Packard in 2002. In late 2015 Hewlett-Packard split into two separate companies (HP Inc. and Hewlett Packard Enterprise), so the current owner cannot be firmly established. New commercial licenses have not been issued at least since October 1979 (RSX-11A, RSX-11B, RSX-11C) or 1990 (IAS), and none of these operating systems was ever licensed for hobbyist use.

=== RSTS ===
In 1997 DEC and Mentec granted anyone wishing to use RSTS 9.6 or earlier for non-commercial, hobby purposes a no-cost license. The license is only valid on the SIMH PDP-11 emulator. The license also covers some other DEC operating systems. Copies of the license are included in authorized software kit available for download on the official website of the SIMH emulator.
