= Portable character set =

Characters mandatory in POSIX standard

Portable Character Set is a set of 103 characters which, according to the POSIX standard, must be present in any character set. Compared to ASCII, the Portable Character Set lacks some control characters, and does not prescribe any particular value encoding. The Portable Character Set is a superset of the Basic Execution Character Set as defined by ANSI C.

name	glyph	C string	Unicode	Unicode name
NUL		\0	U+0000	NULL (NUL)
alert		\a	U+0007	ALERT (BEL)
backspace		\b	U+0008	BACKSPACE (BS)
tab		\t	U+0009	CHARACTER TABULATION (HT)
newline		\n	U+000A	LINE FEED (LF)
vertical-tab		\v	U+000B	LINE TABULATION (VT)
form-feed		\f	U+000C	FORM FEED (FF)
carriage-return		\r	U+000D	CARRIAGE RETURN (CR)
space			U+0020	SPACE
exclamation-mark	!	!	U+0021	EXCLAMATION MARK
quotation-mark	"	\"	U+0022	QUOTATION MARK
number-sign	#	#	U+0023	NUMBER SIGN
dollar-sign	$	$	U+0024	DOLLAR SIGN
percent-sign	%	%	U+0025	PERCENT SIGN
ampersand	&	&	U+0026	AMPERSAND
apostrophe	'	\'	U+0027	APOSTROPHE
left-parenthesis	(	(	U+0028	LEFT PARENTHESIS
right-parenthesis	)	)	U+0029	RIGHT PARENTHESIS
asterisk	*	*	U+002A	ASTERISK
plus-sign	+	+	U+002B	PLUS SIGN
comma	,	,	U+002C	COMMA
hyphen	-	-	U+002D	HYPHEN-MINUS
period	.	.	U+002E	FULL STOP
slash	/	/	U+002F	SOLIDUS
zero	0	0	U+0030	DIGIT ZERO
one	1	1	U+0031	DIGIT ONE
two	2	2	U+0032	DIGIT TWO
three	3	3	U+0033	DIGIT THREE
four	4	4	U+0034	DIGIT FOUR
five	5	5	U+0035	DIGIT FIVE
six	6	6	U+0036	DIGIT SIX
seven	7	7	U+0037	DIGIT SEVEN
eight	8	8	U+0038	DIGIT EIGHT
nine	9	9	U+0039	DIGIT NINE
colon	:	:	U+003A	COLON
semicolon	;	;	U+003B	SEMICOLON
less-than-sign	<	<	U+003C	LESS-THAN SIGN
equals-sign	=	=	U+003D	EQUALS SIGN
greater-than-sign	>	>	U+003E	GREATER-THAN SIGN
question-mark	?	?	U+003F	QUESTION MARK
commercial-at	@	@	U+0040	COMMERCIAL AT
A	A	A	U+0041	LATIN CAPITAL LETTER A
B	B	B	U+0042	LATIN CAPITAL LETTER B
C	C	C	U+0043	LATIN CAPITAL LETTER C
D	D	D	U+0044	LATIN CAPITAL LETTER D
E	E	E	U+0045	LATIN CAPITAL LETTER E
F	F	F	U+0046	LATIN CAPITAL LETTER F
G	G	G	U+0047	LATIN CAPITAL LETTER G
H	H	H	U+0048	LATIN CAPITAL LETTER H
I	I	I	U+0049	LATIN CAPITAL LETTER I
J	J	J	U+004A	LATIN CAPITAL LETTER J
K	K	K	U+004B	LATIN CAPITAL LETTER K
L	L	L	U+004C	LATIN CAPITAL LETTER L
M	M	M	U+004D	LATIN CAPITAL LETTER M
N	N	N	U+004E	LATIN CAPITAL LETTER N
O	O	O	U+004F	LATIN CAPITAL LETTER O
P	P	P	U+0050	LATIN CAPITAL LETTER P
Q	Q	Q	U+0051	LATIN CAPITAL LETTER Q
R	R	R	U+0052	LATIN CAPITAL LETTER R
S	S	S	U+0053	LATIN CAPITAL LETTER S
T	T	T	U+0054	LATIN CAPITAL LETTER T
U	U	U	U+0055	LATIN CAPITAL LETTER U
V	V	V	U+0056	LATIN CAPITAL LETTER V
W	W	W	U+0057	LATIN CAPITAL LETTER W
X	X	X	U+0058	LATIN CAPITAL LETTER X
Y	Y	Y	U+0059	LATIN CAPITAL LETTER Y
Z	Z	Z	U+005A	LATIN CAPITAL LETTER Z
left-square-bracket	[	[	U+005B	LEFT SQUARE BRACKET
backslash	\	\\	U+005C	REVERSE SOLIDUS
right-square-bracket	]	]	U+005D	RIGHT SQUARE BRACKET
circumflex	^	^	U+005E	CIRCUMFLEX ACCENT
underscore	_	_	U+005F	LOW LINE
grave-accent	`	`	U+0060	GRAVE ACCENT
a	a	a	U+0061	LATIN SMALL LETTER A
b	b	b	U+0062	LATIN SMALL LETTER B
c	c	c	U+0063	LATIN SMALL LETTER C
d	d	d	U+0064	LATIN SMALL LETTER D
e	e	e	U+0065	LATIN SMALL LETTER E
f	f	f	U+0066	LATIN SMALL LETTER F
g	g	g	U+0067	LATIN SMALL LETTER G
h	h	h	U+0068	LATIN SMALL LETTER H
i	i	i	U+0069	LATIN SMALL LETTER I
j	j	j	U+006A	LATIN SMALL LETTER J
k	k	k	U+006B	LATIN SMALL LETTER K
l	l	l	U+006C	LATIN SMALL LETTER L
m	m	m	U+006D	LATIN SMALL LETTER M
n	n	n	U+006E	LATIN SMALL LETTER N
o	o	o	U+006F	LATIN SMALL LETTER O
p	p	p	U+0070	LATIN SMALL LETTER P
q	q	q	U+0071	LATIN SMALL LETTER Q
r	r	r	U+0072	LATIN SMALL LETTER R
s	s	s	U+0073	LATIN SMALL LETTER S
t	t	t	U+0074	LATIN SMALL LETTER T
u	u	u	U+0075	LATIN SMALL LETTER U
v	v	v	U+0076	LATIN SMALL LETTER V
w	w	w	U+0077	LATIN SMALL LETTER W
x	x	x	U+0078	LATIN SMALL LETTER X
y	y	y	U+0079	LATIN SMALL LETTER Y
z	z	z	U+007A	LATIN SMALL LETTER Z
left-brace	{	{	U+007B	LEFT CURLY BRACKET
vertical-line	|	|	U+007C	VERTICAL LINE
right-brace	}	}	U+007D	RIGHT CURLY BRACKET
tilde	~	~	U+007E	TILDE

== Character Classes ==
Characters grouped by their class.

Unicode range	Character Class	POSIX.1-2017 Standard
U+0000	Control	Portable
U+0001 to U+0006	Control	Non-Portable
U+0007 to U+0008	Control	Portable
U+0009 to U+000D	White-space	Portable
U+0010 to U+001F	Control	Non-Portable
U+0020	White-space	Portable
U+0021 to U+002F	Punctuation	Portable
U+0030 to U+0039	Digit	Portable
U+003A to U+0040	Punctuation	Portable
U+0041 to U+005A	Uppercase Letter	Portable
U+005B to U+0060	Punctuation	Portable
U+0061 to U+007A	Lowercase Letter	Portable
U+007B to U+007E	Punctuation	Portable
U+007F	Control	Non-Portable

== Portable filename character set ==
POSIX also standardizes a portable filename character set, a much smaller subset of 65 of the above characters: 26 uppercase letters, 26 lowercase letters, 10 decimal digits, and three punctuation characters "period", "underscore", and "hyphen".

To be usable across all POSIX locales, a pathname should consist only of characters from that portable filename character set, "slash" characters, and a single final "NUL" character. Like the Portable Character Set that these characters are taken from, the encoding of the portable filename character set is not specified.

To be usable across all POSIX locales, user names, group names, file names, and directory names should be composed only from characters from the portable filename character set. The "hyphen" should not be used as the first character of any of those names.

Many people recommend using only this portable filename character set for file names and directory names, even on systems that technically could use other letters and symbols; perhaps by using utilities such as detox, convmv, and Glindra to fix "bad" filenames.
