= System Industries =

Computer hardware manufacturer

System Industries, Inc., was an American computer hardware company active from 1968 to 1993. It produced printers and disk drives for minicomputers.

== History ==
The firm was founded in 1968 by Ed Zschau with backing from Brentwood Associates, a private equity firm. Corporate earnings were followed by The New York Times. Their focus was to be a third-party provider of DEC-compatible equipment, especially for printers and disk drives (and their controllers).

In 1992 they acquired Emulex's disk drive business. By 1993 System Industries was dealing with a Chapter 11 bankruptcy. That same year they introduced an eraseable optical disc product and an 8mm magnetic tape storage devices.

System Industries was one of 19 manufacturers of disk drive products that were sued in the late 1980s and early 1990s by Digital Equipment Corporation for alleged patent violations. Individual settlements were reached.

== Silonics ==
System Industries had a subsidiary named Silonics, which made ink-jet printers. By 1980, System Industries found it more profitable to focus on its disk business.

== SIMACS (SImultaneous Machine ACceSs) ==
System Industries developed a capability for having more than one DEC CPU, but not at the same time, have write access to a shared disk. They implemented an enhancement called SIMACS (SImultaneous Machine ACceSs), which allowed their special disk controller to set a semaphore flag for disk access, allowing multiple WRITES to the same files; the disk is shared by multiple DEC systems. SIMACS existed on VAX and PDP-11 RSTS systems.

== Advertising ==
It's "80 Mbytes of storage for under $12K!" ad was considered noteworthy by Computerworld, which in 2007, 2012 and 2017 headlined "... And other ad favorites," "... And other IT ad favorites," and "10 fun tech ads through the years." A CIO magazine "looking-back" item also noted the aforementioned ad headline.
