= DTT =

DTT may refer to:

== Science and technology ==
- Demographic transition theory, on the fall in birthrates
- Digital terrestrial television
- Discrete trial training, in applied behaviour analysis
- Dithiothreitol, a chemical

== Finance ==
- Double taxation treaty
- Deloitte Touche Tohmatsu or DTT International

== Other uses ==
- German Terminology Association (German: Deutscher Terminologie-Tag)
- Detroit metropolitan area's IATA airport code
