= DIGITAL Command Language =

Command language adopted by several operating systems (OSs)

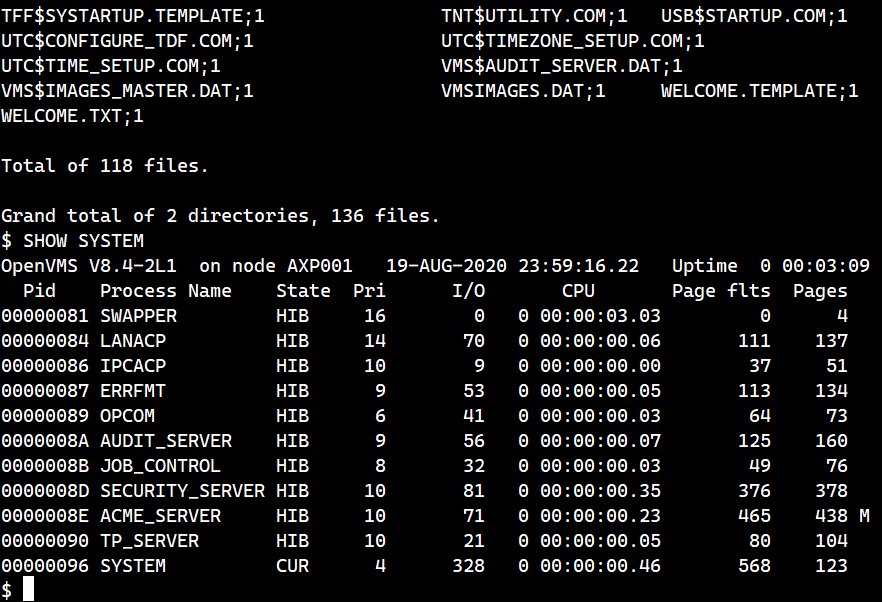
- OpenVMS Alpha V8.4-2L1, showing the DCL CLI in a terminal session
- Paradigm: imperative
- Designed by: Digital Equipment Corporation
- Developer: VMS Software Inc. (VSI)
- OS: IAS, RSTS/E, RSX-11, RT-11, OpenVMS, VAXELN, MICA

Influenced by
- CCL, MCR

Influenced
- Windows PowerShell

DIGITAL Command Language (DCL) is the standard command language for many of the operating systems created by Digital Equipment Corporation. DCL was originally implemented for IAS as the Program Development System (PDS), and later added to RSX-11M, RT-11 and RSTS/E, but took its most powerful form in VAX/VMS (later OpenVMS). DCL continues to be developed by VSI as part of OpenVMS.

DCL is a scripting language supporting several data types, including strings, integers, bit arrays, arrays and Booleans, but not floating point numbers. Access to OpenVMS system services (kernel API) is through lexical functions, which perform the same as their compiled language counterparts and allow scripts to get information on system state. DCL includes IF-THEN-ELSE, access to all the Record Management Services (RMS) file types including stream, indexed, and sequential, but lacks a DO-WHILE or other looping construct, requiring users to make do with IF and GOTO-label statements instead.

DCL is available for other operating systems as well, including

- VCL and VX/DCL for Unix,
- VCL for MS-DOS, OS/2 and Windows,
- PC-DCL and Open DCL for Windows/Linux
- and Accelr8 DCL Lite for Windows.

DCL is the basis of the XLNT language, implemented on Windows by an interpreter-IDE-WSH engine combination with CGI capabilities distributed by Advanced System Concepts Inc. from 1997.

== Command-line parser ==
For the OpenVMS implementation, the command line parser is a runtime library (CLI$) that can be compiled into user applications and therefore gives a consistent command line interface for both OS supplied commands and user written commands. The command line must start with a verb and is then followed by up to 8 parameters (arguments) and/or qualifiers (switches in Unix terminology) which begin with a '/' character. Unlike Unix, a space is not required before the '/'. Qualifiers can be position independent (occurring anywhere on the command line) or position dependent, in which case the qualifier affects the parameter it appears after. Most qualifiers are position independent. Qualifiers may also be assigned values or a series of values. Only the first most significant part of the verb and qualifier name is required. Parameters can be integers or alphanumeric text.

An example OS command may look like:

set audit /alarm /enable=(authorization, breakin=all)
show device /files $1$DGA1424:

The second show command could also be typed as:

sho dev $1$DGA1424:/fil

While DCL documentation usually shows all DCL commands in uppercase, DCL commands are case-insensitive and may be typed in upper-, lower-, or mixed-case.

Some implementations such as OpenVMS and RSX used a minimum uniqueness scheme in allowing commands to be shortened.

Unlike other systems which use paths for locating commands, DCL requires commands to be defined explicitly, either via CLD (Command Language Definition) definitions or a foreign symbol. Most OpenVMS-native commands are defined via CLD files; these are compiled by the CDU, the Command Definition Utility, and added to a DCL 'table' — SYS$LIBRARY:DCLTABLES.EXE by default, although processes are free to use their own tables—and can then be invoked by the user. For example, defining a command FOO that accepts the option "/BAR" and is implemented by the image SYS$SYSEXE:FOO.EXE could be done with a CLD file similar to:

DEFINE VERB FOO
   IMAGE "SYS$SYSEXE:FOO.EXE"
   QUALIFIER BAR

The user can then type "FOO", or "FOO/BAR", and the FOO program will be invoked. The command definition language supports many types of options, for example dates and file specifications, and allows a qualifier to change the image invoked—for example "CREATE", to create a file, vs. CREATE/DIRECTORY to create a directory.

The other (simpler, but less flexible) method to define commands is via foreign commands. This is more akin to the Unix method of invoking programs. By giving the command:

foo :== $sys$sysexe:foo.exe

the command 'FOO' will invoke FOO.EXE, and supply any additional arguments literally to the program, for example, foo -v. This method is generally used for programs ported from Unix and other non-native systems; for C programs using argc and argv command syntax.

Versions of OpenVMS DCL starting with V6.2 support the DCL$PATH logical name for establishing Unix-style command paths. This mechanism is known as an Automatic Foreign Command. DCL$PATH allows a list of directories to be specified, and these directories are then searched for DCL command procedures (command.COM) and then for executable images (command.EXE) with filenames that match the command that was input by the user. Like traditional foreign commands, automatic foreign commands also allow Unix-style command input.

== Scripting ==
DCL scripts look much like any other scripting language, with some exceptions. All DCL verbs in a script are preceded with a $ symbol; other lines are considered to be input to the previous command. For example, to use the TYPE command to print a paragraph onto the screen, one might use a script similar to:

$ TYPE SYS$INPUT:
This is an example of using the TYPE verb
in the DCL language.
$ EXIT

== Indirect variable referencing ==
It is possible to build arrays in DCL that are referenced through translated symbols. This allows the programmer to build arbitrarily sized data structures using the data itself as an indexing function.

$ i = 1
$ variable'i' = "blue"
$ i = 2 
$ variable'i' = "green"
$ j = 1
$ color = variable'j'
$ rainbow'color' = "red"
$ color = variable'i'
$ rainbow'color' = "yellow"

In this example the variable rainbowblue is assigned the value "red", and rainbowgreen is assigned the value "yellow".

== Commands ==
The following is a list of DCL commands for common computing tasks that are supported by the OpenVMS command-line interface.

- COPY
- COPY/FTP
- CREATE
- DELETE
- DIRECTORY
- EDIT
- LOGOUT
- PRINT
- RENAME
- SET
- SHOW
- TYPE

== Lexical functions ==
Lexical functions provide string functions and access to VMS-maintained data.

Some Lexicals are:

- F$EXTRACT(start,length,string) — extract a substring
- F$CVTIME — obtain date/time info, e.g.
  YEST_DOW=F$EXTRACT(0,3,F$CVTIME(DATE_EXPR,,"WEEKDAY"))
- F$ELEMENT(0," ",ABC_DEF) — for ABC_DEF = "ABC DEF" would return "ABC"
- F$SEARCH — searches for a file, returns a null ("") if not found
- F$LOCATE(needle,haystack)
- F$SetPRV("BYPASS,CMKRNL,ALTPRI") — it's a privilege to have access to this.

== See also ==
- Comparison of command shells
