= Transport document =

A transport document is a kind of document used to convey information about cargo that is being transported.

Kinds of transport documents include:

- Air Waybill, a transport document used for air freight
- Bill of Lading, a transport document for sea freight
- CMR (transport document), a transport document for road freight for use in all European countries, as well as some countries in Asia and Africa.
