= Dynamic Debugging Technique =

Series of debugger programs

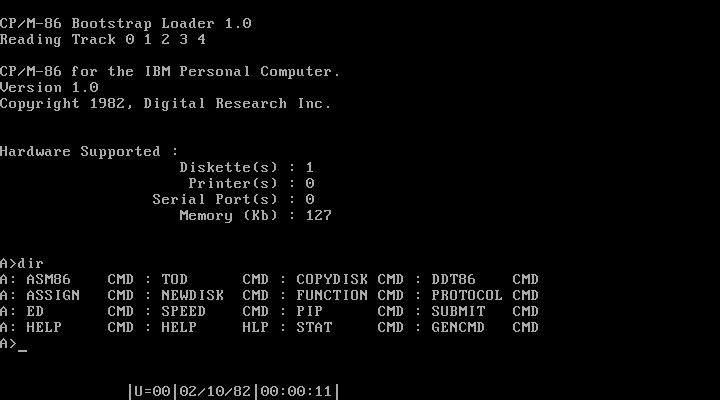
DDT86.CMD in Digital Research CP/M-86 for the IBM Personal Computer Version 1.0

Dynamic Debugging Technique (DDT) is a series of debugger programs originally developed for Digital Equipment Corporation (DEC) hardware, initially known as DEC Debugging Tape because it was distributed on paper tape. The name is a pun on the insecticide DDT, which "kills bugs".

The first version of DDT was developed at MIT for the PDP-1 computer in 1961. It was an adaptation of the early interactive, symbolic debugger FLIT (the "Flexowriter Interrogation Tape", itself a play on the name of a once-popular brand of insect spray), developed for MIT's TX-0 computer in 1959. Newer versions of DDT on newer platforms continued to use the acronym DDT, but the name "Dynamic Debugging Technique", introduced by 1965, prevailed by the late 1960s. Early versions of Digital Research's CP/M and CP/M-86 kept the name DDT (and DDT-86 and DDT-68K) for their debugger, reinterpreted as Dynamic Debugging Tool. The CP/M DDT was later superseded by the Symbolic Instruction Debugger (SID, ZSID, SID86, and GEMSID) in DR DOS and GEM.

In addition to its normal function as a debugger, DDT was also used as a top-level command shell for the Massachusetts Institute of Technology (MIT) Incompatible Timesharing System (ITS) operating system; on some more recent ITS systems, "PWORD"—which implements a restricted subset of DDT's functionality—is run first and is overlaid with DDT as soon as the user logs in. DDT could run and debug up to eight processes (called "jobs" on ITS) at a time, such as several sessions of TECO, and DDT could be run recursively - that is, some or all of those jobs could themselves be DDTs (which could then run another eight jobs, and so on). These eight jobs were all given unique names, and the usual name for the original and top-most DDT was "HACTRN" ("hack-tran"). Guy L. Steele wrote a filk poem parody of Edgar Allan Poe's "The Raven," entitled The HACTRN.

== DEC-10/DEC-20 DDT ==
DDT (Dynamic Debugging Technique), as implemented on the DECsystem-10 & DECSYSTEM-20 allowed references to symbols within the programming being debugged. This feature loaded symbols from the .EXE executable file; a special version named SDDT used symbols from the running monitor and allowed system programmers to "peek" inside.

== See also ==
- On-line Debugging Tool (ODT)
- Tracing Debugging Technique (TDT)
- DEBUG (DOS command)
- Comparison of computer shells
