= RSTS/E =

Computer operating system

RSTS
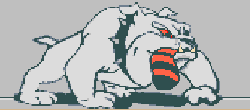

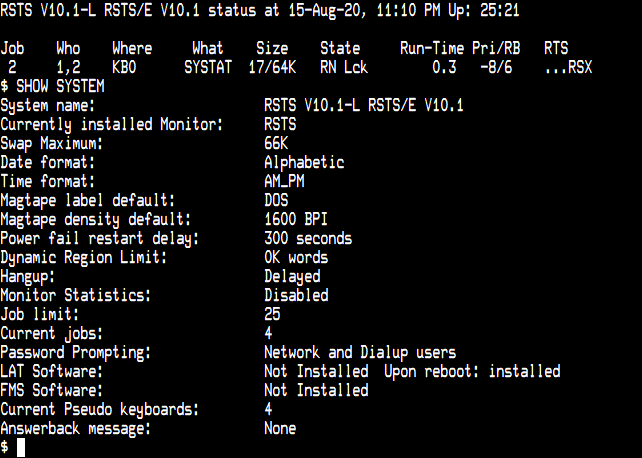
- RSTS/E 10.1, running the DCL CLI
- Developer: Digital Equipment Corporation, later Mentec
- Written in: MACRO-11 assembly language, BASIC-PLUS-2, DCL
- Working state: No development, still available
- Source model: Closed source
- Initial release: 1970; 56 years ago
- Latest release: RSTS V10.1 / 1992; 34 years ago
- Available in: English
- Update method: Binary patches, complete binaries
- Package manager: BACKUP
- Supported platforms: PDP-11
- Kernel type: Time-sharing operating systems
- Default user interface: Command-line interface: DCL (Digital Command Language)
- License: Proprietary
- Preceded by: TSS/8

RSTS (/ˈrɪstɪs/) is a multi-user time-sharing operating system developed by Digital Equipment Corporation (DEC, now part of Hewlett-Packard) for the PDP-11 series of 16-bit minicomputers. The first version of RSTS (RSTS-11, Version 1) was implemented in 1970 by DEC software engineers that developed the TSS-8 time-sharing operating system for the PDP-8. The last version of RSTS (RSTS/E, Version 10.1) was released in September 1992. RSTS-11 and RSTS/E are usually referred to just as "RSTS" and this article will generally use the shorter form. RSTS-11 supports the BASIC programming language, an extended version called BASIC-PLUS, developed under contract by Evans Griffiths & Hart of Boston. Starting with RSTS/E version 5B, DEC added support for additional programming languages by emulating the execution environment of the RT-11 and RSX-11 operating systems.

== Acronyms and abbreviations ==
- BTSS (Basic Time Sharing System – never marketed) – The first name for RSTS.
- CCL (Concise Command Language) – equivalent to a command to run a program kept in the Command Line Interpreter.
- CIL (Core Image Library) – A container file format used to hold one or more standalone (bootable) programs and operating systems, such as RSTS through version 6A.
- CILUS (Core Image Library Update and Save) – DOS-11 program to manipulate a CIL file.
- CLI (Command Line Interpreter) – See Command-line interface.
- CUSPs (Commonly Used System Programs) – System management applications like Task Manager or Registry Editor on Microsoft Windows. On RSTS-11, CUSPs were written in BASIC-Plus just like user programs.
- DCL (Digital Command Language) – See DIGITAL Command Language.
- DTR (DATATRIEVE) – programming language
- FIP (File Information Processing) – resident area for issuing file requests
- FIRQB (File Information Request Queue Block) – A data structure containing information about file requests.
- KBM (Keyboard Monitor) – Analogous to Command Line Interpreter.
- LAT (Local Area Transport) – Digital's predecessor to TCP/IP
- MFD (Master File Directory) – Root directory of file system.
- PBS (Print Batch Services)
- PIP (Peripheral Interchange Program)
- PPN (Project Programmer Number) – Analogous to GID and UID in Unix.
- RDC (Remote Diagnostics Console) – A replacement front panel for a PDP-11 which used a serial connection to the console terminal or a modem instead of lights and toggle switches to control the CPU.
- RSTS-11 (Resource Sharing Time Sharing System) – The first commercial product name for RSTS
- RSTS/E (Resource Sharing Timesharing System Extended) – The current implementation of RSTS.
- RTS (Run Time System) – Read only segment of code provided by the supplier which would be mapped into the high end of a 32K, 16-bit word address space that a user program would use to interface with the operating system. Only one copy of an RTS would be loaded into RAM, but would be mapped into the address space of any user program that required it. In essence, shared, re-entrant code, to reduce RAM requirements, by sharing the code between any programs that required it.
- RTSS (Resource Time Sharing System – never marketed) – The second name for RSTS
- SATT (Storage Allocation Truth Table) a series of 512KB blocks on every disk that indicated if the block, or cluster, on the whole disk was allocated on the disk. Bitwise, a 1 indicated a cluster was in use; a 0 indicated it was not in use.
- SIL (Save Image Library) – The OS container file format after the RSTS system generation procedure was switched from one using DOS-11 to one running natively on RSTS/E, called that by analogy to the CIL it replaced.
- SILUS (Save Image Library Update and Save) – The program to create SIL files, called that by analogy to the (unrelated) DOS-11 CILUS program it replaced.
- UFD (User File Directory) – A user's home directory. Root directory of a file system.
- XRB (Transfer Request Block) – A data structure containing information about other types of system requests that do not use FIRQBs to convey the information

== Development ==
=== 1970s ===
The kernel of RSTS was programmed in the assembly language MACRO-11, compiled and installed to a disk using the CILUS program, running on a DOS-11 operating system. RSTS booted into an extended version of the BASIC programming language which DEC called "BASIC-PLUS". All of the system software CUSPS for the operating system, including the programs for resource accounting, login, logout, and managing the system, were written in BASIC-PLUS. From 1970 to 1973, RSTS ran in only 56K bytes of magnetic core memory (64 kilobytes including the memory-mapped I/O space). This would allow a system to have up to 16 terminals with a maximum of 17 jobs. The maximum program size was 16K bytes. By the end of 1973 DEC estimated there were 150 licensed systems running RSTS.

In 1973, memory management support was included in RSTS (now RSTS/E) for the newer DEC PDP-11/40 and PDP-11/45 minicomputers (the PDP-11/20 was only supported under RSTS-11). The introduction of memory management in the newer PDP-11 computers not only meant these machines were able to address four times the amount of memory (18-bit addressing, 256K bytes), it also paved the way for the developers to separate user mode processes from the core of the kernel.

In 1975, memory management support was again updated for the newer 22-bit addressable PDP-11/70. RSTS systems could now be expanded to use as much as two megabytes of memory running up to 63 jobs. The RTS and CCL concepts were introduced although they had to be compiled in during "SYSGEN". Multi-terminal service was introduced which would allow a single job the ability to control multiple terminals (128 total). Large-message send/receive and interprocess communication became very sophisticated and efficient. By August there are 1,200 licensed systems.

In 1977, the installation process for RSTS was no longer dependent on DOS-11. The RSTS kernel could now be compiled under the RT-11 RTS, formatted as a kernel file with RT-11 SILUS, and copied to the system or other disks, while the computer was time-sharing. The BASIC-PLUS RTS (as well as RT-11, RSX-11, TECO and third party RTSs) all ran as user mode processes, independent of the RSTS kernel. A systems manager could now decide during the bootstrap phase which RTS to run as the systems default Keyboard Monitor (KBM). By now, there were some 3,100 licensed systems.

In 1978, the final memory management update was included for all machines that could support 22-bit addressing. RSTS could now use the maximum amount of memory available to a PDP-11 (4 megabytes). Support was also included for SUPERVISORY mode which made RSTS the first DEC operating system with this capability. DECnet was also supported as well as remote diagnostics from field service technicians at the RDC in Colorado Springs, Colorado (a DEC subscription service). By the end of the decade, there are over 5,000 licensed systems.

=== 1980s ===
In 1981, support for separate instruction and data space for users with Unibus machines (PDP-11/44, PDP-11/45, PDP-11/55 and PDP-11/70) provided an extension to the memory constraints of an individual program. Compiling programs to use separate instruction and data space would soon give a program up to 64 KB for instructions, and up to 64 KB for buffering data. The DCL RTS was included as well as support for the newer revision of DECnet III.

By 1983, with an estimated 15,000 DEC machines running RSTS/E, V8.0-06 included support for the smallest 18-bit PDP-11 sold by DEC (the MicroPDP-11). A pre-generated kernel and CUSPS were included in this distribution to make installation on the MicroPDP-11 easier. DEC sold the pre-generated version on the MicroPDP-11 as MicroRSTS at a reduced price, however users needed to purchase the full version if they had a need to generate their own kernel. The file system was upgraded and given the designation RSTS Directory Structure 1 (RDS1). All previous versions of the RSTS file system are given the designation RDS0. The newer file system was designed to support more than 1700 user accounts. "It is now thought that there are well over 10,000 licensed users and at least an equal number of unlicensed users!".

From 1985 to 1989, RSTS became a mature product in the Version 9 revisions. DCL was installed as the primary RTS and the file system was again upgraded (now RDS1.2) to support new user account features. Passwords were encrypted using a modified DES algorithm instead of limited to six (6) characters stored in DEC Radix-50 format. Before Version 9, there was a non-user system account in the project (group) zero (the designation is [0,1]), and all accounts in project number 1 were privileged (not unlike the root account on Unix systems). With the release of Version 9, additional accounts could be created for project zero, and multiple privileges could be individually set for any account. Support for the LAT protocol was included, as well as the ability to run the newest version of DECnet IV. These network enhancements give any user connected to a terminal through a DECserver the ability to communicate with a RSTS machine, just as easily as with a VAX running VMS. The DCL command structure between DEC operating systems also contributed to the familiar look and feel:

This is not just another pseudo command file processor; it is based on VMS features. The DCL command file processor is fully supported and integrated in RSTS through extensive changes to DCL and the monitor. DCL executes command files as part of your job; therefore, no pseudo keyboard or forcing of commands to your keyboard is necessary (as with ATPK).

=== 1990s ===
In 1994, DEC sold most of its PDP-11 software business to Mentec. Digital continued to support its own PDP-11 customers for a short period after with the assistance of Mentec staff.

In 1997, Digital and Mentec granted anyone wishing to use RSTS 9.6 or earlier for non-commercial, hobby purposes no-cost license. The license is only valid on the SIMH PDP-11 emulator. The license also covers some other Digital operating systems. Copies of the license are included in an authorized software kit available for download on the official website of the SIMH emulator.

== Documentation ==
The standard complement of documentation manuals that accompanies a RSTS distribution consists of at least 11 large three-ring binders (collectively known as "The orange wall"), one small three-ring binder containing the RSTS/E Quick Reference Guide and a paperback copy of Introduction to BASIC AA-0155B-TK. Each of the 11 three-ring binders contains:

Example of a RSTS/E document shelf

Volume 1: General Information and Installation

- Documentation Directory
- Release Notes
- Maintenance Notebook
- System Installation and Update Guide

Volume 2: System Management

- System Manager's Guide

Volume 3: System Usage

- System User's Guide
- Guide to Writing Command Procedures

Volume 4: Utilities

- Utilities Reference Manual
- Introduction to the EDT Editor
- SORT/MERGE User's Guide
- RUNOFF User's Guide

Volume 4A: Utilities

- EDT Editor Manual

Volume 4B: Utilities

- Task Builder Reference Manual
- Programmer's Utilities Manual
- RT11 Utilities Manual
- TECO User's Guide

Volume 5: BASIC-PLUS

- BASIC-PLUS Language Manual

Volume 6: System Programming

- Programming Manual

Volume 7: MACRO Programming

- System Directives Manual
- ODT Reference Manual

Volume 7A: MACRO Programming

- MACRO-11 Language Manual
- RMS-11 MACRO Programmer's Guide

Volume 8: RMS [Record Management Services]

- RMS-11: An Introduction
- RMS11 User's Guide
- RMS-11 Utilities

== Operation ==
=== Communication ===
RSTS uses a serial communication connection to interact with the operator. The connection might be a local computer terminal with a 20 mA current loop interface, an RS-232 interface (either local serial port or remote connection via modem), or by an Ethernet connection using DECnet or LAT. As many as 128 terminals (using multi-terminal service) can connect to a RSTS system, running a maximum of 63 jobs (depending on the processor being used, the amount of memory and disk space, and the system load). Most RSTS systems had far fewer terminals. Users can also submit jobs to be run in batch mode. There is also a batch program called "ATPK" that allows users to run a series of commands on an imaginary terminal (pseudo-terminal) in semi-interactive mode similar to batch commands in MS-DOS.

=== Login [Project, Programmer] ===
Users connect to the system by typing the LOGIN command (or HELLO) at a logged-out terminal and pressing return. Typing any command at a logged-out terminal starts the LOGIN program which then interprets the command. If it is one of the commands which were allowed to be used by a user that is not yet logged in ("Logged Out"), then the associated program for that command is CHAINed, otherwise the message "Please say HELLO" is printed on the terminal. Prior to Version 9, a user can also initiate a 1 line login, however this leaves the user's password on the screen for anyone else in the room to view (examples follow):

RSTS/E login and logout with BASIC as default RTS

Bye

HELLO 1,1;SECRET

Ready

or

I 1,1;SECRET

Ready

or

LOGIN 1,1;SECRET

Ready

The status of a terminal can be determined from the command responses, printed by the command interpreter. A logged-in user communicating with the BASIC-PLUS KBM (key board monitor) is given the prompt "Ready" and a user who is logged out is given the prompt "Bye".

A user logs in by supplying their PPN number and password. User numbers consist of a project number (equivalent to a group number in Unix), a comma, and a programmer number. Both numbers are in the range of 0 to 254, with special exceptions. When specifying an account, the project and programmer number are enclosed in brackets. A typical user number can be [10,5] (project 10, programmer 5), [2,146], [254,31], or [200,220], etc. When a user is running a system program while logged out (because the system manager has enabled it) their PPN number is [0,0], and appears in the SYSTAT CUSP as **,**. Thus that is not a valid account number. If the user specifies a slash (/) instead of a comma between the project number and programmer number, a system wide message stored in [1,2]NOTICE.TXT (equivalent to the Unix motd) will not be displayed at login.

=== System and user accounts ===
In every project, the programmer number 0 is usually reserved to as a group account, as it can be referenced by the special symbol #. If one's user number is [20,103], a reference to a file name beginning with "#" refers to a file stored in the account of the user number [20,0]. This feature is useful in educational environments, as programmer number 0 can be issued to the instructor of a class, and the individual students given accounts with the same project number, and the instructor can store in his account files marked as shared only for that project number (which would be students in that class only, and no other).

Two special classes of project numbers exist. The project number 0 is generally reserved for system software, and prior to Version 9 there is only 1 project 0 account (named [0,1]). Programmers in the project number 1 are privileged accounts, equivalent to the single account "root" on Unix systems, except that the account numbers [1,0] through [1,254] are all privileged accounts. As of Version 9, any account can be granted specific privileges by the systems manager.

The account [0,1] is used to store the operating system file itself, all run-time library systems, and certain system files relating to booting the system (author's comments appear on the right in bold):

DIR [0,1]
 Name .Ext    Size   Prot    Date       SY:[0,1]
BADB  .SYS       0P  < 63> 06-Jun-98         List of bad blocks
SATT  .SYS       3CP < 63> 06-Jun-98         Bitmap of allocated disk storage
INIT  .SYS     419P  < 40> 06-Jun-98         Operating system loader program
ERR   .ERR      16CP < 40> 06-Jun-98         System error messages
RSTS  .SIL     307CP < 60> 06-Jun-98         Operating system itself
BASIC .RTS      73CP < 60> 06-Jun-98         BASIC-PLUS run time system
RT11  .RTS      20C  < 60> 06-Jun-98         RT-11 run time system
SWAP  .SYS    1024CP < 63> 06-Jun-98         System swap file
CRASH .SYS      35CP < 63> 06-Jun-98         System crash dump
RSX   .RTS      16C  < 60> 23-Sep-79         RSX-11 run-time system
TECO  .RTS      39C  < 60> 24-Sep-79         TECO text editor

Total of 1952 blocks in 11 files in SY:[0,1]

(Editor's note: This directory listing is prior to Version 9.)

The DIR command is an installed CCL equivalent to a RUN command for the DIRECT program. [0,1] is the account number (and directory name) of the operating system storage account. It would be referred to as "project number 0, programmer number 1".

The numbers shown after each file represent its size in disk blocks, a block being 512 bytes or 1/2 kilobyte (K). "C" indicates the file is contiguous (is stored as one file without being separated into pieces, similar to files on a Microsoft Windows system after a drive has been defragmented), while "P" indicates it is specially protected (cannot be deleted, even by a privileged user, unless the P bit is cleared by separate command). The numbers in brackets (like "< 40>") represent the protections for the file, which is always displayed in decimal. Protections indicate if the file may be seen by any other user, by other users with the same programmer number, if the file is read only or if it may be altered by another user, and whether the file may be executed by an ordinary user giving them additional privileges. These protection codes are very similar to the r, w and x protections in Unix and similar operating systems such as BSD and Linux. Code 60 is equivalent to a private file, code 63 is a private non-deletable file, and 40 is a public file.

Library files are kept in account [1,1] and it is usually referenced by the logical name LB:. The account [1,2] is the system startup account (much like a Unix system starting up under root), and contains the system CUSPS that could be referenced by prefixing the CUSP name with a dollar sign ($). "!" is used for account [1,3], "%" for [1,4] and "&" for [1,5]. The account [1,1] also had the special privilege of being the only account where a user logged in under that account is permitted to execute the POKE system call to put values into any memory in the system. Thus the account number [1,1] is the closest equivalent to "root" on Unix-based systems.

== Run-time environments ==
One of the features of RSTS is the means for the execution of programs and the environment used to run them. The various environments allowed for programming in BASIC-PLUS, the enhanced and hard compiled BASIC-Plus-2, and in more traditional programming languages such as COBOL (eventually upgraded to COBOL-85) and FORTRAN IV (eventually upgraded to FORTRAN-77). Other languages were supported such as DIBOL and MUMPS. These environments were separate from each other such that one could start a program from one environment and the system would switch to a different environment while running a different program, and then return the user to the original environment they started with. These environments were referred to as a Runtime System (RTS). The term for the command line interface that most of these RTSs had was the KBM. Prior to Version 9, the systems manager needed to define which RTS the system would start under, and it had to be one that would execute compiled programs.

A systems manager may also install special CCL (concise command language) commands, which take precedence over all KBM commands (with the exception of DCL). A CCL is analogous to a shortcut to a program on a Windows system or a symbolic link on Unix-based systems. CCLs are installed as a memory-resident command either during startup, or dynamically while the system is running by a system's manager (i.e.: it is not permanent like a disk file).

When logged in, a user can "SWITCH" to any of these environments, type language statements in the BASIC-PLUS programming language, issue RUN commands to specific programs, or issue a special command called a CCL to execute a program with command options.

Most RSTS systems managers generated the kernel to include the "Control-T" one line status option which could tell the user what program they were running, under what RTS the program was using, how much memory the program was taking, how much it could expand to, and how much memory the RTS was using.

=== BASIC-PLUS ===
Programs written in BASIC-PLUS ran under the BASIC RTS, which allowed them up to 32K bytes of memory (out of 64K total). The language was interpreted, each different keyword being internally converted to a unique byte code and the variables and data being indexed and stored separately within the memory space. The internal byte-code format was known as PCODE. When the interactive SAVE command was issued, the BASIC Plus RTS simply saved the working memory area to a disk file with a ".BAC" extension. Although this format was undocumented, two Electronic Engineering undergraduates from Southampton University in the UK (Nick de Smith and David Garrod) developed a decompiler that could reverse engineer BAC files into their original BASIC-Plus source, complete with original line numbers and variable names (both subsequently worked for DEC).The rest of the memory was used by the BASIC RTS itself. If one wrote programs in a language that permitted true binary executables such as BASIC-Plus-2, FORTRAN-IV, or Macro Assembler, then the amount of memory available would be 56K (8K allocated to the RTS). The standard BASIC-PLUS prompt is the "Ready" response, pressing Control-T displays status (example):

new
New file name--HWORLD

Ready

10 Print "Hello World"
20 Input "Press Control-T for 1 line status: ";a$
30 End
run
HWORLD  10:17 PM        01-Jan-08
Hello World
Press Control-T for 1 line status: ?
1       KB0     HWORLD+BASIC    KB(0R)  2(16)K+14K      0.2(+0.0) +0

Ready

save

Ready

compile

Ready

DIR HWORLD.*/na/ex/si/pr
SY:[1,2]
HWORLD.BAS       1   < 60>
HWORLD.BAC       7C  <124>

Total of 8 blocks in 2 files in SY:[1,2]

Ready

=== DCL (Digital Command Language) ===
Starting with Version 9, DCL became the primary startup RTS even though it does not have the ability to execute binary programs. This became possible with the advent of the disappearing RSX RTS (see below). DCL was incorporated into all of the recent versions of DEC's operating systems (RSX-11, RT-11, VMS, and later OpenVMS) for compatibility. The standard DCL prompt is the dollar "$" sign (example):

$ write 0 "Hello World, it is "+F$TIME()
Hello World, it is 01-Jan-08 10:20 PM
$ inquire p1 "Press Control-T for 1 line status:"
Press Control-T for 1 line status:
1       KB0      DCL+DCL       KB(0R)       4(8)K+24K       0.1(+0.1) -8
$ set verify/debug/watch
$ show memory
(show memory)
(SYSTAT/C)

Memory allocation table:
 Start   End  Length  Permanent   Temporary
   0K -   85K (  86K) MONITOR
  86K - 1737K (1652K)   (User)
1738K - 1747K (  10K)   (User)    DAPRES LIB
1748K - 1751K (   4K)   (User)    RMSRES LIB
1752K - 2043K ( 292K) ** XBUF **
2044K -  *** END ***
$

=== RSX (Realtime System eXecutive) ===
Programs that were written for the RSX RTS such as COBOL, Macro Assembler, or later releases of BASIC-Plus-2, could use the maximum amount of memory available for a binary program (56K due to the requirements of an RTS needing the top 8K to use for itself). RSTS Version 7 and later allowed the RSX RTS to be included in the kernel, making it completely "disappear" from the user address space, thus allowing 64K bytes of memory for user programs.

Programs got around the limitations of the amount of available memory by using libraries (when permissible), by complicated overlay strategies, or by calling other programs ("Chaining") and passing them commands and data in a shared memory area called "Core Common," among other practices.

When RSX is the default KBM, the standard RSX prompt (both logged in and logged out) is the ">" (or MCR "Monitor Console Routine") sign (example):

>run
Please type HELLO
>HELLO 1,1;SECRET
>run
?What?
>help
Valid keyboard commands are:

ASSIGN    DISMOUNT  HELP      RUN     UNSAVE
BYE       EXIT      MOUNT     SHUTUP
DEASSIGN  HELLO     REASSIGN  SWITCH

>run CSPCOM
CSP>HWORLD=HWORLD
CSP>^Z
>RUN TKB
TKB>HWORLD=HWORLD,LB:CSPCOM.OLB/LB
TKB>//
>run HWORLD.TSK
Hello World
Press Control-T for 1 line status: ?
1       KB0     HWORLD+...RSX   KB(0R)  7(32)K+0K       0.8(+0.2) +0

>DIR HWORLD.*/na/ex/si/pr
SY:[1,2]
HWORLD.BAS       1   < 60>
HWORLD.BAC       7C  <124>
HWORLD.OBJ       2   < 60>
HWORLD.TSK      25C  <124>

Total of 35 blocks in 4 files in SY:[1,2]

>

=== RT-11 ===
The RT-11 RTS emulated the Single Job version of the RT-11 distribution. Like the RSX emulation, RT-11 occupied the top 8K of memory, leaving the bottom 56K for CUSPS, programs written in FORTRAN-IV or Macro Assembler. When RT-11 is the default KBM, the standard RT-11 prompt (both logged in and logged out) is the "." sign (example):

.VERSION
Please type HELLO

.HELLO 1,1;SECRET

.VERSION
RT-11SJ V3-03; RSTS/E V8.0

.R PIP
*HWORLD.MAC=KB:
        .MCALL .TTYIN,.PRINT,.EXIT
HWORLD: .ASCII /Hello World/<15><12>
        .ASCIZ /Press Control-T for 1 line status:/
        .EVEN

Start:  .PRINT #HWORLD
        .TTYIN
        .EXIT
        .END    START
^Z
*^Z

.R MACRO
HWORLD=HWORLD
*^Z

.R LINK
*HWORLD=HWORLD
*^Z

.R HWORLD.SAV
Hello World
Press Control-T for 1 line status:
1       KB0     HWORLD+RT11     KB(0R)  2(28)K+4K       0.6(+0.2) +0

..DIR HWORLD.*/na/ex/si/pr
SY:[1,2]
HWORLD.BAS       1   < 60>
HWORLD.BAC       7C  <124>
HWORLD.TSK      25C  <124>
HWORLD.MAC       1   < 60>
HWORLD.OBJ       1   < 60>
HWORLD.SAV       2C  <124>

Total of 37 blocks in 6 files in SY:[1,2]

.

=== TECO (Text Editor and COrrector) ===
The TECO editor was itself implemented as an RTS to maximize the amount of memory available for the editing buffer, and also because it was first implemented in RSTS V5B, before the release of the general purpose runtime systems (RSX and RT11). TECO was the only RTS distributed with RSTS that did not contain a built-in KBM. The user would start up TECO (like any other program) by running a TECO program (TECO.TEC). TECO and the affine QEDIT were the direct ancestors of the first UNIX-based text editor, ED. Most RSTS systems used CCL's to create a file (MAKE filespec), edit a file (TECO filespec), or run a TECO program (MUNG filespec, data). The following program is an example of how TECO could be used to calculate pi (currently set to 20 digits):

Ready

run TECO
*GZ0J\UNQN"E 20UN '
BUH BUV HK
QN< J BUQ QN*10/3UI
QI< \ +2*10+(QQ*QI)UA
B L K QI*2-1UJ QA/QJUQ
QA-(QQ*QJ)-2\ 10@I// -1%I >
QQ/10UT QH+QT+48UW QW-58"E 48UW %V ' QV"N QV^T '
QWUV QQ-(QT*10)UH >
QV^T @^A/
/HKEX$$
31415926535897932384

Ready

== RSTS easter eggs ==
=== System start-up (INIT.SYS) ===
If a user typed an unrecognized command at system boot to the "Option:" prompt of INIT.SYS, the startup utility, the message "Type 'HELP' for help" was displayed. If the user subsequently typed 'HELP' (including the quotes) to the prompt, the response was "How amusing, anyway..." followed by the actual help message.

=== PDP-11 console lights ===
A system manager could compile into the kernel a rotating display pattern that gave the illusion of two snakes chasing each other around the console lights. The normal kernel would give the illusion of one snake moving from right to left in the data lights across the bottom. If the system manager also compiled the "lights" object module the user would see an additional snake moving from left to right in the address lights across the top. This was accomplished by using supervisory mode in the versions prior to 9.0. RSX also had a similar display pattern that would appear as if two snakes were playing chicken and would run into each other in the center of the console.

=== Teco easter egg ===
The command 'make' allowed a user to make a text file and automatically enter the TECO text editor. If a user typed 'make love', the system created a file called 'love' and typed back, 'Not War?'

=== Open Files List ===
Kevin Herbert, later working for DEC, added an undocumented feature in the 90's to allow a user to enter ^F to see a list of open files the user process had, complete with blocks in use and file sizes.

=== Stardate ===
Beginning with version 9.0, an undocumented feature would allow the system manager to change the display of the system date. RSTS became the first operating system that would display the system date as a set of numbers representing a stardate as commonly known from the TV series Star Trek.

== Add-ons by other companies ==
System Industries bought the only source license for RSTS to implement an enhancement called SIMACS (SImultaneous Machine ACceSs), which allowed their special disk controller to set a semaphore flag for disk access, allowing multiple WRITES to the same files on a RSTS System where the disk is shared by multiple PDP-11 RSTS systems. This feature was implemented in System Industries controllers that were attached to many DEC computers and designed by Dr. Albert Chu while he worked at System Industries.

The main innovation was use of a semaphore, a flag to indicate which processor, by cooperative sharing, has exclusive write access.

This required many changes to the way access to disks was accomplished by the RSTS operating system. The FIPS (File Information Processing System) system, that handled i/o access, was single-threaded in RSTS. To allow a disk access to stall while another machine had active access to a block, required that the FIPS could timeout a request, go to the next request and 'come back' to the stalled one in a round robin fashion. The code to allow this was written by Philip Hunt while working at System Industries, in Milpitas, California. He eventually worked for Digital Equipment in the New England area in the late 1980s and early 1990s.

SIMACS was not limited to the PDP-11 product line; VAXen could also use it.

== RSTS emulations ==
=== ROSS/V ===
In 1981, Evans Griffiths & Hart marketed the ROSS/V product. ROSS/V allowed all user mode processes of RSTS (CUSPS, RTSs and user programs) the ability to run unmodified under VMS on the VAX-11 machines. The code for this emulation handled all of the kernel processes that would normally be handled by a RSTS kernel running on a PDP-11. The original BASIC-PLUS language that has carried through all versions of RSTS was subcontracted by Evans Griffiths & Hart, Inc. for a fixed price of $10,500.

=== Other PDP-11 emulators ===
RSTS and its applications can run under a number of PDP-11 emulators such as SIMH and Ersatz-11. For more information, see PDP-11.

== Versions ==
RSTS was originally called BTSS (Basic Time Sharing System). Before shipment began, the name was changed from BTSS to RTSS because a product called BTSS was already being marketed by Honeywell. A simple typing mistake changed the name from RTSS to RSTS.

Version	Release date	Notes
1	Never released	
2A-19	1971	Installed at Carleton College and Seattle Pacific College.
2B	June 1971	Installed at the Delaware School Auxiliary Association.
2C	October 1971	Enhanced software support (record I/O)
3A-19	January 1972	
3B	May 1972	
3C	June 1972	Enhanced software support (UPDATE mode)
4A-12	October 1972	New hardware supported.
4B	July 1975	A patched version of V4A with no new features

The addition of new memory management support and the ability to install more memory in the PDP-11/40 and PDP-11/45 led to another name change: RSTS-11 now became RSTS/E.

Version	Release date	Notes
5A-21	July 1973	Memory management extensions from 64KB to 256KB.
5B-24	November 1974	Multiple SWAP files, RTS and CCL introduced.
5C-01	March 1975	A patched version of V5B with no new features.
6A-02	August 1975	New hardware, 22 bit addressing (2 MB), 63 jobs.
6B-02	February 1977	New hardware, SYSGEN under RT-11, CCL at runtime.
6C-03	February 1978	DECnet Phase II, DTR, DIBOL supported. SUPERVISOR mode.
7.0	August 1978	New hardware, (4 MB), RDC support.
7.1	February 1981	Kernel mode Instruction & Data space support, DECnet Phase III.
7.2	August 1982	New hardware (UDA50 drives).
8.0-06	April 1983	New hardware (MicroPDP-11).
9.0-14	May 1985	New hardware, DCL default, PBS, multiple privs, hashed passwords, new Backup utility, and Stardate.
9.1-05	October 1985	Enhanced hardware support, multi-threaded FIP, LOAD INDEX.
9.2-10	June 1986	New hardware supported.
9.3-20	January 1987	Enhanced hardware support, DECnet Phase IV.
9.4	July 1987	New hardware, Scheduler and Terminal Service improvements.
9.5-08	December 1987	Clustersize increased to 64, BACKUP/DIR added.
9.6	September 1988	LAT support, HELP SPIKE.
9.7	July 1989	New hardware, DV0: at runtime, ANSI PDP-11C available.
10.0	May 1990	Command line history in TTDRV.
10.1	September 1992	Y2K fixes.

=== Clones in the USSR ===
- DOS-KP ("ДОС-КП")

== Applications ==
Computer bureaus sometimes deployed User-11 for RSTS/E-based data management.

== See also ==
- Asynchronous System Trap
- BASIC-Plus-2
- Concise Command Language
- DATATRIEVE
- DECnet
- Front panel
- Kevin Mitnick
- Local Area Transport
- Octal Debugging Technique
- QIO
- Record Management Services
- Runtime system
- Time-sharing
- Time-sharing system evolution
