= German Terminology Association =

Professional association in Germany

The German Terminology Association (German Deutscher Terminologie-Tag e.V., commonly known in English by the abbreviation DTT) is a registered professional association in Germany for individuals and organizations interested in terminology. The DTT was founded in 1987 and is registered in Cologne.

The DTT's mission is to find ways of improving technical communication through terminology management. It acts as a forum for discussing terminology issues and supports individuals, companies, and public agencies, domestic and foreign, in achieving their own terminological goals. The DTT cooperates with other organizations on terminology management matters, including the Council for German-Language Terminology (German Rat für deutschsprachige Terminologie), Infoterm, TermNet, the German technical communication association tekom, the Federal Association of Interpreters and Translators (German Bundesverband der Dolmetscher und Übersetzer e.V.) and the European Association for Terminology, among others.

The DTT's original group of experts in terminology management theory and practice developed into the German Institute for Terminology (German Deutsches Institut für Terminologie e.V., or DIT), which continues to serve as the advisory board for the DTT.

The DTT sponsors a biennial symposium featuring topics of interest in terminology work. In addition the DTT organizes seminars and lectures and releases publications including the twice-yearly technical journal Edition, proceedings of the symposiums, and a "Best Practice" guide for terminology management.
