= SIMH =

Multi-system emulator

Open SIMH
- Open SIMH help screen
- Original author: Robert M. Supnik
- Developer: The Open SIMH Project
- Release: 1994; 32 years ago
- Written in: C
- Operating system: Windows, Linux, macOS, FreeBSD, OpenBSD, NetBSD, OpenVMS
- Platform: x86, IA-64, PowerPC, SPARC, ARM
- Type: Hardware virtualization
- License: MIT License
- Website: opensimh.org
- Repository: github.com/open-simh

SIMH is a free and open source, multi-platform multi-system emulator. It was developed by Bob Supnik, a former DEC engineer and DEC vice president.

== History ==
SIMH was based on a much older systems emulator called MIMIC, which was written in the late 1960s at Applied Data Research. It was a minicomputer simulator created by Mike McCarthy, Len Feshkens, and Bob Supnik that ran on a PDP-10.

The SIMH project began in 1993 and the first version was released by Supnik in 1994. It then transformed from a one-person project to a collaborative effort coordinated on GitHub.

In May 2022, the MIT License of SIMH version 4 on GitHub was unilaterally modified by a contributor to make it no longer free software, by adding a clause that revokes the right to use any subsequent revisions of the software containing their contributions if modifications that "influence the behavior of the disk access activities" are made. As of 27 May 2022, Supnik no longer endorses this version 4 on his official website for SIMH due to these changes, only recognizing the "classic" version 3.x releases.

On 3 June 2022, the last revision of SIMH not subject to this clause (licensed under BSD licenses and the MIT License) was forked by the group Open SIMH, with a new governance model and steering group that includes Supnik and others. The Open SIMH group cited that a "situation" had arisen in the project that compromised its principles. Open SIMH is governed by a Steering Group that includes Supnik, Clem Cole, Richard Cornwell, Paul Koning, Timothe Litt, and Seth Morabito.

The forked V4 stream is currently being developed at the Open SIMH GitHub. The "classic" version continues to be maintained, with version 3.12-5 released on 16 July 2024, and is available as a tagged branch of Open SIMH.

== Emulated hardware ==
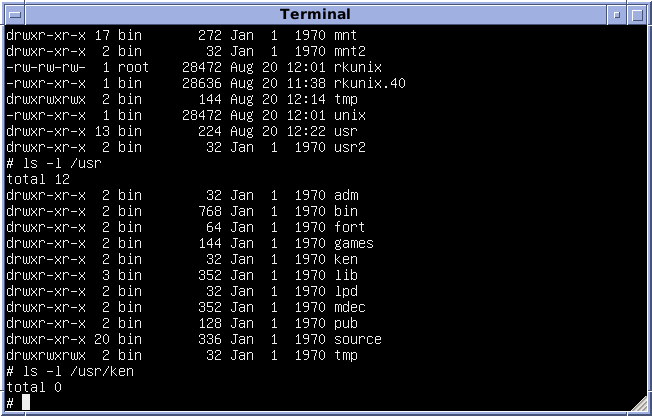
Version 6 Unix for the PDP-11, running in SIMH

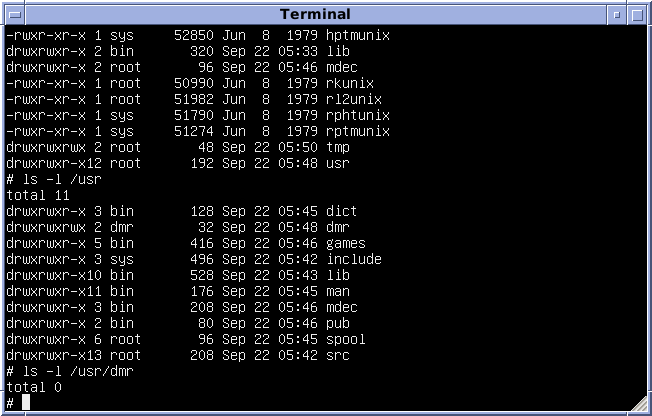
Version 7 Unix for the PDP-11, running in SIMH

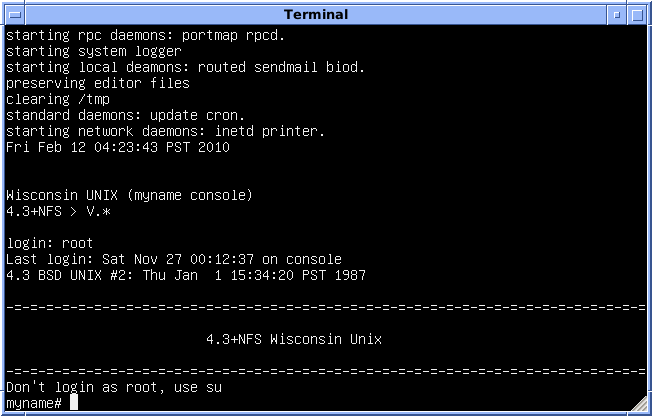
"4.3 BSD UNIX" from the University of Wisconsin, on a simulated VAX.

SIMH emulates hardware from the following companies.

=== Advanced Computer Design ===
- PDQ-3

=== AT&T ===
- 3B2

=== BESM ===
- BESM-6

=== Burroughs ===
- B5500

=== Control Data Corporation ===
- CDC 1700

=== Data General ===
- Nova
- Eclipse

=== Digital Equipment Corporation ===
- Alpha
- PDP-1
- PDP-4
- PDP-7
- PDP-8
- PDP-9
- PDP-10
- PDP-11
- PDP-15
- VAX Family Systems
  - MicroVAX I, VAXStation I
  - MicroVAX II, VAXStation II
  - MicroVAX 3900
  - VAX 11/730
  - VAX 11/750
  - VAX 11/780
  - VAX 8600

=== GRI Corporation ===
- GRI-909

=== Hewlett-Packard ===
- 2116
- 2100
- 21MX
- 3000

=== Honeywell ===
- H316
- H516

=== IBM ===
- 650
- 701
- 704
- 1401
- 1620
- 1130
- 7010
- 7070
- 7080
- 7090/7094
- System/3

=== Intel ===
- Intel systems 8010 and 8020

=== Interdata ===
- 16-bit series
- 32-bit series

=== Lincoln Labs – MIT Research Lab ===
- TX-0

=== Manchester University ===
- Baby, or SSEM

=== MITS ===
- Altair 8800 both Intel 8080 and Zilog Z80 versions
  - N8VEM - a hobbyist variant of the Altair Z80

=== Norsk Data ===
- Nord-100

=== Royal-Mcbee ===
- LGP-30
- LGP-21

=== Sage Computer Technology ===
- Sage II

=== Scientific Data Systems ===
- SDS 940

=== SWTPC ===
- SWTPC 6800

=== Systems Engineering Laboratories ===
- SEL-32 both Concept-32 and PowerNode systems

=== Xerox Data Systems ===
- Sigma
