= Interactive Application System =

Old DEC operating system

Interactive Application System (IAS)
- Developer: Digital Equipment Corporation
- OS family: RSX-11
- Working state: Discontinued
- Initial release: 1975; 50 years ago
- Latest release: 3.4 / May 1990; 34 years ago
- Available in: English
- Platforms: PDP-11
- Influenced by: RSX-11D
- Default user interface: PDS or MCR Command-line interface
- License: Proprietary

Interactive Application System (IAS) was a DEC operating system for the PDP-11. It was a fork from RSX-11D.

The last major release, Version 3.0, began distribution late 1979; the final version, 3.4, came out May 1990.

== Overview ==
DEC's RSX-11A and C were paper tape based, B had limited disk support, "D" was for disk, and the "M" designation was for "small Memory requirement" /later "Multi-user" (with RSX-11M Plus being a followup). IAS was designed to a mix of "concurrent timesharing, real-time and batch." A looking back described it as "bare basics .. handled interrupts .. scheduled processes, and provided interprocess communications" without being "all things to all people." Another description, rather than focusing on taking away overhead, wrote "IAS (Interactive Application System) was created by adding two things to 11D."

RSX-11's use of a version number as part of a file's identifier: MYFILE.DAT;3 was retained by IAS.

The batch facility's command files used the same syntax as the indirect command files available to interactive users; multiple batch jobs could run concurrently. The system could be tuned to either leave unused CPU cycles to batch, or to guarantee a minimum level (without taking from Real Time requirements).

IAS provided two different Command Language Interpreter (CLI) interfaces - the RSX-11 MCR, and the Program Development System (PDS). PDS was an early implementation of the Digital Command Language.

DEC's Sort/Merge utility program was distributed as part of IAS.

== Performance ==
The system can be operated in one of three modes: Real-Time, Multi-User, and Timesharing.

Multi-User shares the system with Real-Time tasks; Timesharing adds effective concurrent use of batch processing alongside "noncritical real-time tasks" and interactive users. Timesharing also adds Timesharing Control Primitives (TCP), described as a "mechanism for timesharing tasks to invoke and communicate with other timesharing tasks." An evaluation by TRW's Defense and Space Systems Group for Tactical Operations Analysis Support Facility at Langley AFB VA highlighted the "IAS heuristic timesharing scheduler" and "subtasking support at the Kernel Executive level via the SPAWN system directive."

The heuristic timesharing scheduler tracks "history of performance and degree of interaction."

Some failure recovery is built into both the DEC hardware and IAS software.
