= MIT150 =

- Awarded for: The most significant innovators, inventions, or ideas from MIT, MIT alumni, and other MIT-related people and organizations
- Country: United States
- Presented by: Boston Globe
- First award: 2011
- Website: MIT150

The MIT150 is a list published by the Boston Globe, in honor of the 150th anniversary of the Massachusetts Institute of Technology (MIT) in 2011, listing 150 of the most significant innovators, inventions or ideas from MIT, its alumni, faculty, and related people and organizations in the 150 year history of the institute.

The top 30 innovators and inventions on the list are:

1. Tim Berners-Lee, inventor of the World Wide Web
2. Eric Lander, team leader for sequencing one-third of the Human Genome
3. William Shockley, inventor of the solid-state transistor
4. Ray Tomlinson, inventor of the "@" symbol use in email addresses
5. Phillip A. Sharp, founder of Biogen Idec
6. Ken Olsen and Harlan Anderson, founders of Digital Equipment Corp.
7. Helen Greiner and Colin Angle, founders of iRobot Corp.
8. Ellen Swallow Richards, nutrition expert, and the first woman admitted to MIT
9. Amar Bose, founder of Bose Corporation
10. Ivan Getting, founder of Aerospace Corp., co-inventor of GPS
11. Salvador Luria, father of modern biology
12. Joseph Jacobson, co-founder of E Ink
13. Dan Bricklin, Bob Frankston, inventors of VisiCalc
14. Brewster Kahle, founder of the Internet Archive
15. Daniel Lewin, F. Thomson Leighton, co-founders of Akamai
16. Vannevar Bush, science advisor to President Franklin D. Roosevelt, founder of Raytheon, father of the National Science Foundation
17. Pietro Belluschi, dean of the MIT School of Architecture and Planning
18. Ron Rivest, Adi Shamir, Leonard Adleman, inventors of RSA cryptography
19. Charles Draper, inventor of the first inertial guidance system
20. Herbert Kalmus, Daniel Comstock, cofounders of Technicolor
21. John Dorrance, inventor of Campbell Soup
22. David Baltimore, Nobel laureate
23. Robert Weinberg, cofounder of the Whitehead Institute
24. William Thompson Sedgwick, founder of the Harvard School of Public Health
25. Alfred P. Sloan, CEO of General Motors
26. William Hewlett, cofounder of Hewlett Packard
27. Marc Raibert, founder of Boston Dynamics and creator of BigDog
28. Hugh Herr, founder of iWalk and head of the Biomechatronics research group at the MIT Media Lab
29. Hoyt C. Hottel, oil industry pioneer
30. Robert Swanson, cofounder of Genentech

== See also ==
- List of awards for contributions to culture
- Massachusetts Institute of Technology
