= Len Kawell =

Len Kawell is an engineer and entrepreneur who once worked at Digital Equipment Corporation (DEC), where he was one of the designers of the VAX/VMS operating system. He also played a key role in the development of the MicroVAX computer, VAX Notes, and VMC Mail. Like DEC co-founders Harlan Anderson and Ken Olsen, Kawell graduated from the University of Illinois at Urbana-Champaign in 1977 with a degree in computer science.

Kawell was co-founder and president of Glassbook, Inc., that was eventually acquired by Adobe. The company developed PDF-based e-book reading software. He was also one of the co-founders of Iris Associates, where he co-designed Lotus Notes, the first commercial groupware product. He would later go on to become the founder of Pepper Computer, where he was chief executive officer. The company was based in Lexington, Massachusetts, and was the developer of the Pepper Pad internet appliance/game console.
