= Groove Networks =

Former software company based in Beverly, Massachusetts

Groove Networks was a software company based in Beverly, Massachusetts, founded in 1997 by Ray Ozzie. The company developed Groove Virtual Office, a peer-to-peer collaboration platform that allowed teams to create shared workspaces, synchronise files, conduct discussions, and work together across organisational boundaries without requiring a central server. Microsoft acquired the company in 2005.

== History ==
Ray Ozzie, who had previously created Lotus Notes at Iris Associates, founded Groove Networks in 1997 with the aim of building a more flexible, decentralised approach to workplace collaboration. Where Lotus Notes relied on server infrastructure administered by IT departments, Groove Virtual Office used a peer-to-peer architecture that allowed groups to set up shared workspaces directly between their computers. This made it well suited to organisations working across firewalls or with external partners.

Groove Virtual Office launched commercially in 2000 and attracted investment from companies including Microsoft and Intel Capital. It allowed users to create project spaces containing tools for document sharing, discussion, calendars, and messaging, with all data synchronised across participants' machines. The software gained a following among defence contractors and government agencies for its ability to operate in low-connectivity environments and across security perimeters.

On March 10, 2005, Microsoft announced that it had acquired Groove Networks for $120 million. Following the acquisition, Ozzie joined Microsoft as Chief Technical Officer, a position he held until 2010. Microsoft incorporated Groove's technology into its Office suite, shipping it as Microsoft Office Groove in Office 2007. The product was subsequently renamed Microsoft SharePoint Workspace with the release of Office 2010, before being discontinued. Elements of the collaborative synchronisation technology developed at Groove Networks later influenced OneDrive within Microsoft 365.

As of February 2013, the servers hosting Groove 2.5n, a file-sharing application, were still operational.
