= The Ultimate Entrepreneur =

The Ultimate Entrepreneur: the story of Ken Olsen and Digital Equipment Corporation
- First edition
- Author: Glenn Rifkin, George Harrar
- Subject: Computer engineering
- Publisher: Contemporary Books
- Publication date: 1988
- Publication place: United States
- Media type: Hardcover
- Pages: 332 pp
- ISBN: 978-1-55958-022-9
- OCLC: 18350498

The Ultimate Entrepreneur: The Story of Ken Olsen and Digital Equipment Corporation is a 1988 biography of Ken Olsen written by Glenn Rifkin and George Harrar. It chronicles the experiences of Olson racing to design minicomputers at the company of his own founding, Digital Equipment Corporation. At the time the book was published by two computer journal writers, Ken Olsen was competing with other Massachusetts computing companies such as Data General (founded by his former employee), Prime Computer, Wang Laboratories, Symbolics, Lotus Development Corporation, and Apollo Computer. While believing in the value of software, he did not believe in the value of software separate from hardware, and missed the opportunity to fund Lotus 1-2-3 or Visicalc. He also missed the importance of the personal computer, but his futuristic vision of the Client–server model helped to launch Ethernet.

== Context ==
The book was written after the book The Soul of a New Machine by Tracy Kidder, which was highly influential in local computing circles. That book documents the competition between Data General and DEC to create a 32-bit minicomputer. Both companies missed the opportunity to launch successful micro-computers and by the time the book was published, the IBM PC had already become a de facto standard. The year 1988 heralded a financial crisis that hit both companies hard, and started a downward slide in sales from which they never recovered.

However, at the time the book was published, the minicomputer market was still quite healthy, and Olsen was known as a dependable and trustworthy employer. DEC's community service projects were well known, most specifically his commitment to higher education and his donations of PDP-8 computers to local high schools in Massachusetts and Connecticut.

== Themes ==
Though the book today serves partially as a historical document of the computing industry, some valuable business lessons can be learned from it. The most important lesson is that a company's culture must change as its operating environment changes. In many ways, Ken Olsen was responsible for much of the innovation that created the personal computer, even though DEC failed to produce any successful personal computer product itself before the book was published.

The title of the book focuses on Ken Olsen's major career success, namely his successful introduction of the minicomputer for small to medium businesses. It is therefore ironic that he failed to see that the next major innovation would be a smaller, personal, home-based computer. To his credit, the massive success of his early minicomputers was such that he was kept busy with improvements to his Programmed Data Processor productline, attempting upward compatibility from the PDP-1 onwards, producing the highly successful PDP-8, and PDP-10. One of his chief engineers, Edson de Castro, left after failing to get permission to design a 16-bit version of the 8-bit PDP-8 and founded Data General. Both men then competed to create a 32-bit version. This competition is well documented in the book The Soul of a New Machine by Tracy Kidder. The VAX became the cash cow for Digital Equipment, and the successful collaboration with Xerox and Intel on the introduction of a local area network solution called Ethernet resulted in a decade of successful growth for the company.
