= Hudson Fab =

Former semiconductor factory in Hudson, Massachusetts

Coordinates: 42.3814°N 71.5546°W

The Hudson Fab was a semiconductor fabrication factory in Hudson, Massachusetts, opened in 1979 by Digital Equipment Corporation (DEC). For many years it produced some of the most complex integrated circuits in the world, as part of the microVAX and related product lines. It underwent a major upgrade in 1994, but DEC's fortunes were already in decline by this point.

In 1997, DEC launched a lawsuit against Intel over the Intel Itanium design, which DEC claimed violated a number of their patents related to HyperThreading. The outcome was that Intel purchased the plant and rights to the DEC's current DEC Alpha and StrongARM designs for $700 million in October 1997. This was part of a wider breakup of DEC being carried out by DEC CEO Robert Palmer, completed in 1998 with the sale of the core of the company to Compaq.

Intel operated the factory as Intel Fab 17. They upgraded from 250 to 180 nm in 1999 as part of their Copy Exactly program to keep all of their fabs using identical equipment and allow them to shift production around their factories. It shifted to 130 nm at some later date. The plant was increasingly used to produce runs of specialty products that could use these older methods. It closed in 2014 as the 149-acre (60 ha) site did not have enough room to be rebuilt to use modern systems.
