= Ray Ozzie =

American software industry entrepreneur (born 1955)

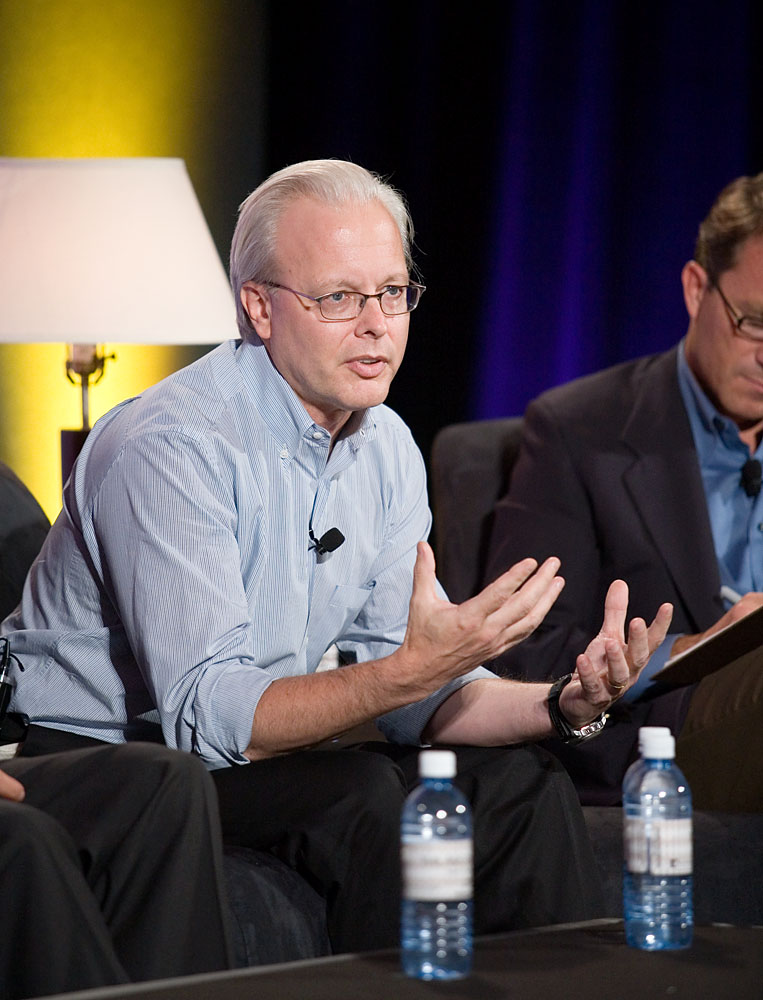
- Ray Ozzie at the Web 2.0 Conference
- Born: November 20, 1955 (age 70); Chicago, Illinois, U.S.
- Education: University of Illinois at Urbana-Champaign
- Known for: Chief Software Architect, Microsoft; Lotus Notes
- Spouse: Dawna Bousquet
- Children: Neil Ozzie; Jill Ozzie

Raymond "Ray" Ozzie (born November 20, 1955) is an American software industry entrepreneur who held the positions of Chief Technical Officer and Chief Software Architect at Microsoft between 2005 and 2010. Before Microsoft, he was best known for his role in creating Lotus Notes.

== Early life and education ==
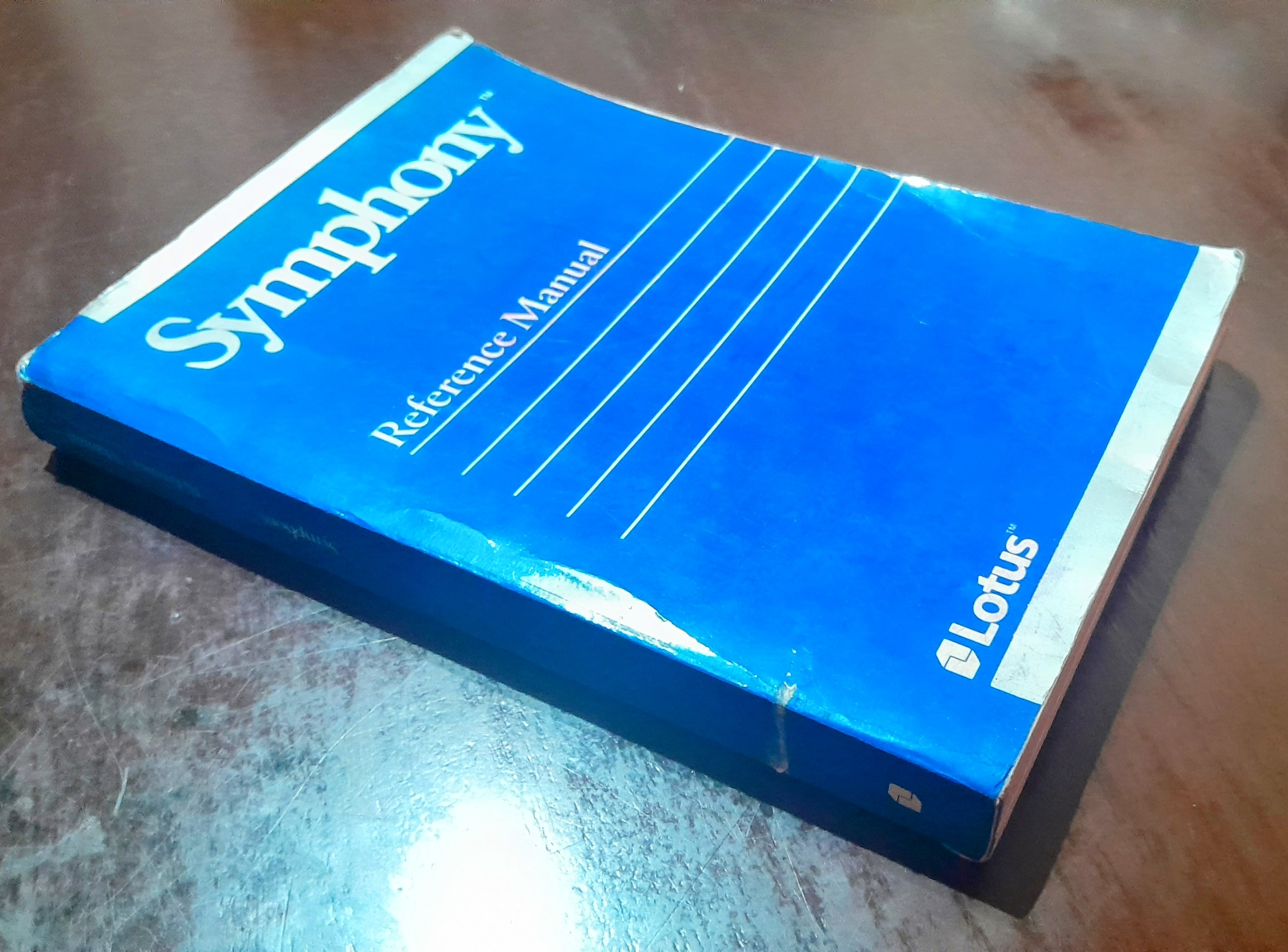
A book of Lotus Symphony (DOS) Reference Manual, published in 1984

Ozzie grew up in Chicago, Illinois, later moving to Park Ridge, Illinois. He graduated from Maine South High School in 1973 where, in 1969, he learned to program on a GE-400 mainframe and an Olivetti-Underwood Programma 101.

In 1979, he received his bachelor's degree in computer science from the University of Illinois at Urbana-Champaign, where he worked on the PLATO system.

== Career ==
Ozzie began his career at Data General Corporation, where he worked for Jonathan Sachs. After leaving Data General, he worked at Software Arts for Dan Bricklin and Bob Frankston, the creators of VisiCalc, on that product and TK Solver.

He was then recruited by Sachs and Mitch Kapor to work for Lotus Development to develop what became Lotus Symphony. Ozzie left Lotus Development in 1984 and founded Iris Associates to create the product later sold by Lotus as Lotus Notes, based in part on his experiences using the PLATO Notes group messaging system. Iris Associates was acquired by Lotus in 1994, and Lotus itself was acquired by IBM in 1995.

Ozzie's early career and ideas about programming are described in the book Programmers at Work, a collection of interviews published by Microsoft Press.

Ozzie worked for Lotus and IBM for several years before leaving in 1997, to form Groove Networks. Groove was acquired by Microsoft in 2005, where Ozzie became one of three Chief Technical Officers. That year, he wrote a seven-page, 5,000-word internal memo, titled The Internet Services Disruption.

On June 15, 2006, Ozzie took over the role of Chief Software Architect from Bill Gates.

In October 2008, Ozzie announced Microsoft Azure, the first project to emerge from his advanced development labs focused on new and potentially disruptive approaches to Microsoft's business. The project, originally known as "Red Dog", was led by Dave Cutler and Amitabh Srivastava.

In January 2009, another project emerging from the development labs, "Live Mesh", received a Crunchie Award for best technology innovation. In October 2009, he also created FUSE Labs (Future Social Experiences) within this advanced development unit, focusing on innovation in social experiences for mobile and web.

On October 18, 2010, Ozzie officially announced his plans to step down from his role at Microsoft.

In 2011, he helped create the non-profit Safecast.

In January 2012, Ozzie started Talko Inc., a company that delivered mobile apps and services for business team communications primarily focused on those roles in which voice is essential. Talko was launched in September 2014. Ozzie has said that the name "Talko" was meant as an homage to Talkomatic, a popular group chat program he experienced while working on the PLATO System in the 1970s. Ray sold the company to Microsoft in December 2015, with the intent to bring Talko's novel voice and productivity features to Microsoft's Skype.

In 2013, Ozzie joined the board of directors at Hewlett-Packard, and continues to serve as a director of Hewlett Packard Enterprise. He joined the board of Safecast in 2017.

In April 2020, Ray Ozzie raised $11 million for his new venture, Blues Wireless, an IoT company. By July 2021, Ozzie had raised $22 million from investors.

== Awards and honors ==
Ozzie was elected a member of the National Academy of Engineering in 2004, for the conception and development of online collaboration products, including Lotus Notes.

== See also ==
- Windows Pioneers
