= Iris Associates =

American software company, 1984–1994

Iris Associates was an American software development company founded in 1984. It developed the software for Lotus Notes (subsequently IBM Notes). Iris worked under contract with Lotus Development Corporation until 1994, when it was bought by Lotus.

== Founding ==
Iris Associates was founded in Westford, Massachusetts on December 7, 1984, by Ray Ozzie. Tim Halvorsen, Steve Beckhardt, and Len Kawell, who joined Iris shortly afterwards in January 1985, met Ray Ozzie years before when all of them were working on the University of Illinois PLATO system. They are widely regarded as the core team behind the creation of Lotus Notes. Len Kawell was the author of PDP-11 Notes and a predecessor of VAX Notes, which shared similar functionality to Lotus Notes but predated the graphical interface of the PC.

== Relationship with Lotus Development Corporation ==
The company's primary funding came from a contractual relationship with Lotus Development Corporation (later known as Lotus Software), best known at the time for its Lotus 1-2-3 spreadsheet software. Lotus funded development of Iris's product (then code-named simply "Notes") in exchange for a future option to purchase exclusive intellectual property, marketing, and sales rights. After this option was exercised years later by Lotus, Iris was additionally compensated through royalties on gross product sales. Lotus Notes was brought to market on Iris's 5th anniversary, December 7, 1989.

The author/publisher contractual relationship between Iris Associates and Lotus Development continued until 1994, when Iris was purchased by Lotus for approximately US$84 million.

== Success of Lotus Notes ==
Only a year later, in the face of the rapid decline of its desktop business, Lotus itself was purchased by IBM for approximately US$3.5 billion and Notes became branded as IBM Notes. Approximately US$3 billion of this price is generally attributed to the purchase of the Notes business.

At the time of the IBM purchase, Lotus reported that Notes had approximately 2.2 million users. In 2004, nearing the 20th anniversary of the founding of Iris Associates, IBM reported that Notes has over 110 million users.
