= Robert Palmer (computer businessman) =

American businessman

Robert B. Palmer (born September 11, 1940) is an American businessman in the computer industry.

Palmer was the final Chairman and Chief Executive Officer of Digital Equipment Corporation.

== Education ==
Palmer majored in Math and Physics at Texas Tech University, Lubbock, Texas.

== Career ==
=== Mostek Corporation ===
Palmer was a founder of Mostek Corporation, founded in 1969 by former employees of Texas Instruments. Mostek manufactured logic, memory, and microprocessor chips. In 1980, United Technologies Corporation (UTC) acquired Mostek Corporation, and Palmer became executive vice president of semiconductor operations.

=== Digital Equipment Corporation ===
In 1985, Palmer joined Digital, and in 1992, he was appointed president and chief executive officer (CEO).

From 1995 to 1998, Palmer served as chairman of the board until Digital was sold to Compaq.

==== Digital Equipment Corporation restructuring ====
From 1993 to 1998, Palmer undertook numerous restructurings, massive layoffs of more than 60,000 people, and plant closings, in an effort to remain competitive.

In 1993, Mitsubishi agreed to manufacture Digital's new Alpha 21066.

In 1994, Digital sold its Rdb database software operations to Oracle Corporation.

In 1995, Digital and Raytheon formed a multiyear, multimillion-dollar agreement to upgrade the onboard computer of the US Navy's E-2C Hawkeye aircraft.

On 30 August 1995, Digital announced the sale of their text terminals business to SunRiver Data Systems, who changed their name to Boundless Technologies in August 1996.

In 1997, Digital sold its printing systems business to Virginia-based GENICOM.

In 1997, Digital sued Intel, accusing it of using some of Digital's patented technology to develop the Pentium microprocessor. Intel countersued, accusing Digital of violating 14 Intel patents. To settle the litigation, Digital sold its semiconductor production operations to Intel in 1998.

In 1997, Digital sold its networking business to Cabletron.

On 13 November 1997, Palmer announced that the corporate strategy would focus on the Internet in Enterprise Computing.

==== Sale of Digital to Compaq ====
In June 1998, Compaq paid approximately $9 billion to acquire Digital, and Palmer stepped down after negotiating the merger.

=== After Digital Equipment Corporation ===
Palmer has served on the boards of a number of companies, including Advanced Micro Devices Inc. (AMD), SEMATECH, the Semiconductor Industry Association, the Semiconductor Research Corporation, Cicada Semiconductor Inc., and NLine Corporation.

Palmer is on the board of trustees of the Cooper Institute for Aerobic Research, a non-profit preventive medicine research and education organization.

=== Awards ===
In 1995 Robert Palmer was honored with an Edison Achievement Award for his commitment to innovation throughout his career.
