= Itsy Pocket Computer =

Handheld device by Digital Equipment Corporation

- Developer: Digital Equipment Corporation
- Type: handheld device
- Released: N/A
- CPU: DEC StrongARM SA-1100
- Memory: 16 MB of DRAM
- Storage: 4 MB of flash memory
- Display: Small 320 x 200 pixel LCD touchscreen
- Graphics: 320 x 200 pixel
- Input: 10 general purpose push-buttons
- Connectivity: I/O interfaces for audio input/output, IrDA, and an RS232 serial port
- Power: Pair of standard AAA alkaline batteries
- Website: www.research.digital.com/wrl/itsy/ at the Wayback Machine (archived October 1, 1999)

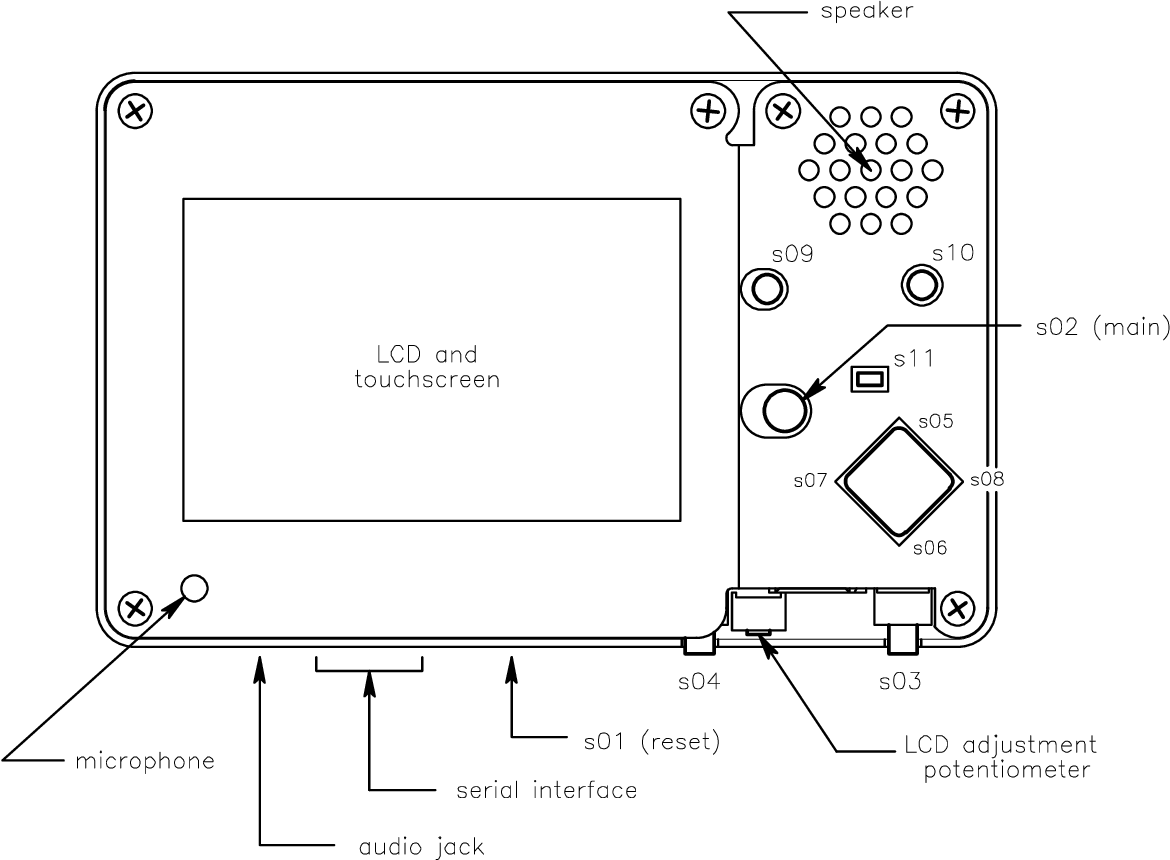
Figure of the front panel from the Itsy computer 1.5

The Itsy Pocket Computer is a small, low-power, handheld device with a highly flexible interface. It was designed at Digital Equipment Corporation's Western Research Laboratory in Palo Alto to encourage novel user interface development—for example, it had accelerometers to detect movement and orientation as early as 1999.

== Hardware ==
- CPU: DEC StrongARM SA-1100 processor
- Memory: 16 MB of DRAM, 4 MB of flash memory
- Interfaces: I/O interfaces for audio input/output, IrDA, and an RS232 serial port
  - Small 320 x 200 pixel LCD touchscreen for display and user input
  - 10 general purpose push-buttons for additional user input purposes
- Power supply: Pair of standard AAA alkaline batteries
