= Ken Olsen =

American computer engineer and businessman (1926–2011)

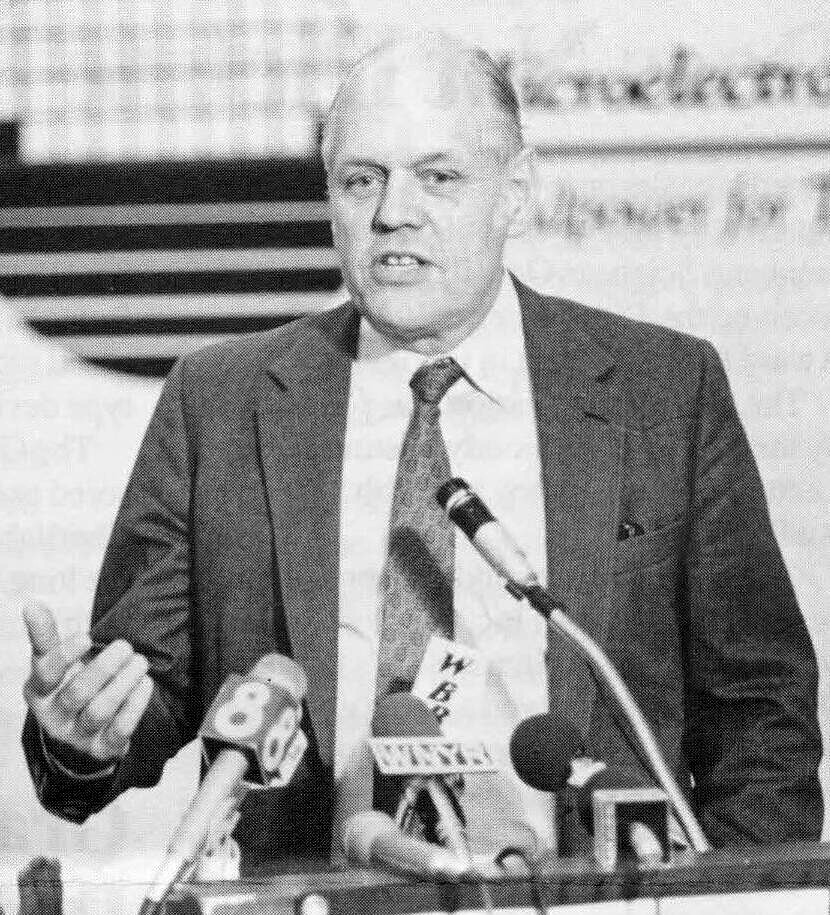
- Olsen in 1986
- Born: Kenneth Harry Olsen; February 20, 1926; Bridgeport, Connecticut, U.S.
- Died: February 6, 2011; Indianapolis, Indiana, U.S.
- Education: Massachusetts Institute of Technology (B.S., 1950; M.S., 1952)
- Occupations: Engineer; businessman
- Known for: Co-founder of Digital Equipment Corporation
- Spouse: Eeva-Liisa Aulikki Olsen (m. 1950; died 2009)
- Children: 3

Kenneth Harry Olsen (February 20, 1926 – February 6, 2011) was an American engineer who co-founded Digital Equipment Corporation (DEC) in 1957 with colleague Harlan Anderson and his brother Stan Olsen.

== Early life ==
Kenneth Harry Olsen was born on February 20, 1926, in Bridgeport, Connecticut and grew up in the neighboring town of Stratford, Connecticut. His father's parents came from Norway and his mother's parents from Sweden. Olsen began his career working summers in a machine shop. Fixing radios in his basement gave him the reputation of a neighborhood inventor.

After serving in the United States Navy between 1944 and 1946, Olsen attended the Massachusetts Institute of Technology, where he earned both a BS (1950) and an MS (1952) degree in electrical engineering.

== Career ==
=== Pre-DEC ===
During his studies at MIT, the Office of Naval Research of the United States Department of the Navy recruited Olsen to help build a computerized flight simulator. Also while at MIT, he directed the building of the first transistorized research computer, the TX-0. Olsen was an engineer who had been working at MIT Lincoln Laboratory on the TX-2 project.

Olsen's most important connection to Project Whirlwind was his work on the Memory Test Computer (MTC), described as "a special purpose computer built to test core memory for the Whirlwind." Unlike the 18-bit TX-0, which was "designed to be a predecessor for a larger 36 bit machine, the TX-2," Whirlwind and the MTC used 16 bits.

=== Digital Equipment Corporation ===
In 1957, Olsen and an MIT colleague, Harlan Anderson, decided to start their own firm. They approached American Research and Development Corporation, an early venture capital firm, which had been founded by Georges Doriot, and founded Digital Equipment Corporation (DEC) after receiving $70,000 for a 70% share. In the 1960s, Olsen received patents for a saturable switch, a diode transformer gate circuit, an improved version of magnetic-core memory, and the line printer buffer. (The MIT professor Jay W. Forrester is generally credited with inventing the first practical magnetic-core memory).

Olsen was known throughout his career for his management style and his fostering of engineering innovation. Olsen's valuing of innovation and technical excellence spawned and popularized techniques such as engineering matrix management, that are broadly employed today throughout many industries. Olsen valued humility, driving an economy car and keeping a simple office in an old mill building. He also was an accomplished pilot and flew his own plane.

In 1977, referring to computers used in home automation at the dawn of the home computer era, Olsen is quoted as saying "There is no reason for any individual to have a computer in his home." Olsen admitted to making the remark, even though he says his words were taken out of context and he was referring to computers set up to control houses, not PCs. According to Snopes.com, "the out-of-context misinterpretation of Olsen's comments is considered much more amusing and entertaining than what he really meant, so that is the version that has been promulgated for decades now".

In 1986, Fortune Magazine named Olsen "America's most successful entrepreneur", and the same year he received the IEEE Engineering Leadership Recognition Award. Olsen was the subject of a 1988 biography, The Ultimate Entrepreneur: The Story of Ken Olsen and Digital Equipment Corporation written by Glenn Rifkin and George Harrar.

In 1993, the Institute of Electrical and Electronics Engineers awarded Olsen their IEEE Founders Medal.

He was inducted as a Fellow of the Computer History Museum in 1996. He was awarded the Vermilye Medal in 1980. He was inducted as an Honorary Member of UPE (the International Honor Society for the Computing and Information Sciences) on October 8, 1975.

In 2011, he was listed at #6 on the MIT150 list of the top 150 innovators and ideas from MIT for his work on the minicomputer.

== Later career history ==
Commencing in 1987, Olsen in public appearances described UNIX as "snake oil". Some believed he was making a general characterization of UNIX, while others believed he was specifically referring to its marketing exaggerating its benefits. While Olsen believed VMS was a better solution for DEC customers and often talked of the strengths of the system, he did approve and encourage an internal effort to produce a native BSD-based UNIX product on the VAX line of computers called Ultrix. However, this line never got enthusiastic comprehensive support at DEC.

Olsen was forced to retire from DEC, stepping down as president in 1992. He subsequently became the chairman of Advanced Modular Solutions. Olsen was also a major contributor to The Family, a religious and political organization.

Olsen was a trustee of Gordon College in Wenham, Massachusetts. There, the Ken Olsen Science Center was named after him in 2006, and dedicated on 27 September 2008. Its lobby features a Digital Loggia of Technology, documenting Digital's technology and history, and an interactive kiosk to which former employees have submitted their stories.

== Death ==
Olsen died while in hospice care in Indianapolis, Indiana on February 6, 2011, aged 84. Gordon College, where he was a trustee and board member, announced his death, but did not reveal the cause. His family also did not comment on any details surrounding his death.

== Awards ==
- 1993: Institute of Electrical and Electronics Engineers in 1993 awarded Olsen the IEEE Founders Medal.
- 1996: The Computer History Museum in 1996 named Olsen a Museum Fellow "for his introduction of the minicomputer and co-founding of Digital Equipment Corporation (DEC)."
- 1999: Olsen was elected to the American Philosophical Society

== See also ==
- Digital Federal Credit Union

== Archives and records ==
- Kenneth H. Olsen Collection at Baker Library Special Collections, Harvard Business School.
