= Harlan Anderson =

American computer engineer and entrepreneur (1929–2019)

Harlan E. Anderson (October 15, 1929 – January 30, 2019) was an American engineer and entrepreneur, best known for co-founding, together with Ken Olsen, Digital Equipment Corporation (DEC), which later became the second-largest computer company in the world. Other notable entities that Anderson has been associated with include Lincoln Laboratory at the Massachusetts Institute of Technology, where he was a member of the technical staff. He served as Director of Technology for Time, Inc., where he spearheaded their evaluation of the future of the printed word during the explosion of television, long before the Internet existed.

Anderson participated in early stage financing for over 20 small technology companies. He was a trustee of Rensselaer Polytechnic Institute (RPI) for 16 years. He was a member of the Board of Advisors of the College of Engineering at the University of Illinois, and a trustee of the Boston Symphony Orchestra.

Anderson was the author of the autobiography entitled, Learn, Earn & Return: My Life as a Computer Pioneer.

== Education ==
Anderson earned both a B.S. and M.S. in physics from the University of Illinois at Urbana–Champaign in the early 1950s, where he became interested in computers. He took programming courses for the ILLIAC I computer, which was under construction at this time. The courses were taught by the computer pioneer, David Wheeler of the University of Cambridge Computer Laboratory. He received a B.S. degree in Engineering Physics and a master's in Physics in 1951 and 1952 respectively.

== Digital Equipment Corporation ==
In 1957, Anderson and Ken Olsen, his boss at Lincoln Laboratory, decided to start their own firm. They approached American Research and Development Corporation, an early venture capital firm, which had been founded by Georges Doriot, and founded Digital Equipment Corporation after receiving $70,000 for a 70% share. They rented space in what had been a woolen mill building in Maynard, Massachusetts. Anderson was employee #2. He departed DEC in 1966 after a dispute with Olsen about the management structure of the company.
