= SunRiver Data Systems =

- Company type: Information Technology
- Founded: 1986
- Founder: Ronnie Hughes; William Long; Kester Rice; Gerald Youngblood
- Defunct: 2003
- Headquarters: Jackson, Mississippi, United States of America

SunRiver Data Systems was a division of SunRiver Corporation, a private company founded in 1986 in Jackson, Mississippi by four electrical engineers (Ronnie Hughes, Bill Long, Kester Rice, and Gerald Youngblood), all former employees of Diversified Technology, Inc. Initially funded by a local businessman, the company moved to Austin, Texas in 1989 after acquiring venture capital financing from Sevin Rosen Funds and Austin Ventures.

SunRiver developed the first Fiber Optic Station, a color graphics terminal which relied on a proprietary, patented, "bus extension" technology in which the parallel data bus of the multi-user computer is serialized and then reconstituted in the terminal device. Custom LSI chips handled both ends of the connection, which later was converted from fiber-optic cable using ST connectors, to Category 5 cable. The Cygna 386 Fiber Optic Station was supported with native drivers by the early DR-DOS operating system produced by Digital Research, as well as SCO (Santa Cruz Operation) XENIX and AT&T UNIX. The Cygna technology did not enjoy extensive commercial success, however, likely due to inherent speed limitations and the popularity of a competing approach offered by Citrix which was later adopted by Microsoft.

SunRiver Data Systems later became Boundless Technologies after simultaneously becoming a public corporation and acquiring the Applied Digital Data Systems division of AT&T in 1994. By 1997, all of the original founders had left the company. Sometime after departing Boundless, Youngblood founded FlexRadio, and Long founded Viridian Gold; Rice and Hughes have continued to work in the semiconductor industry. In 2003, Boundless Corporation filed for Chapter 11 bankruptcy protection, was acquired by the majority public stockholders and moved from Hauppauge, NY to Farmingdale, NY, where it produced terminal emulation software, thin client terminals and replacements for old-style text computer terminals. After a series of 2006 transactions the bankrupt but public Boundless Corporation was merged into the seeking-to-be public Haitian Consulting, a manufacturer of fine chemicals. Ironically, Boundless had become a public company by a similar transaction in 1994 when it used the public company, All Quotes Inc., as a merger vehicle to the public market.
