= Digital Equipment Corporation =

American computer manufacturer (1957–1998)

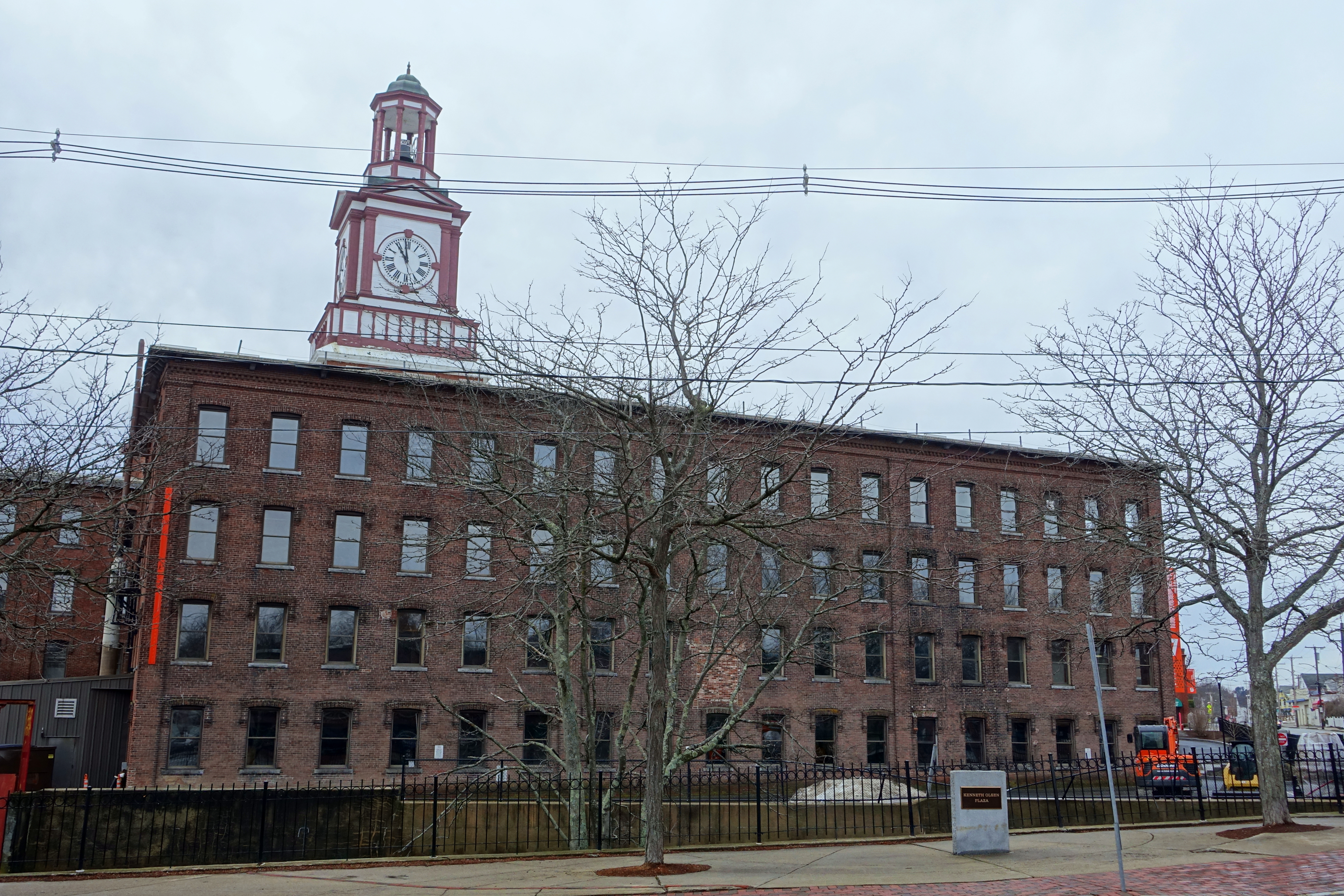
- Assabet Woolen Mill, headquarters of Digital Equipment Corporation from 1957 to 1992
- Industry: Information technology; Computer hardware; Software
- Founded: 1957; 69 years ago
- Founder: Ken Olsen; Harlan Anderson
- Defunct: 1998; 28 years ago
- Fate: Acquired by Compaq, after the divestiture of major assets.
- Successor: Compaq (1998–2002); Hewlett-Packard (2002–2015); HP Inc. and Hewlett Packard Enterprise (2015–present)
- Headquarters: Maynard, Massachusetts, United States
- Key people: Ken Olsen (founder, president, and chairman); Gordon Bell (VP Engineering, 1972–83)
- Products: PDP minicomputers; VAX minicomputers; OpenVMS operating systems; Alpha servers and workstations; DECnet; VT100 and other terminals; LAT and terminal server; StrongARM microprocessors; Digital Linear Tape; Flip-Chip modules; DEC System Modules
- Number of employees: over 140,000 (1987)
- Website: dec.com at the Wayback Machine (archived 1997-06-22)

Digital Equipment Corporation (DEC /dɛk/), using the trademark Digital, was a major American company in the computer industry from the 1960s to the 1990s. The company was founded by Ken Olsen and Harlan Anderson in 1957. Olsen was president until he was forced to resign in 1992, after the company had gone into precipitous decline.

The company produced many different product lines over its history. It is best known for the work in the minicomputer market starting in the early 1960s. The company produced a series of machines known as the PDP line, with the PDP-8 and PDP-11 being among the most successful minis in history. Their success was only surpassed by another DEC product, the late-1970s VAX "supermini" systems that were designed to replace the PDP-11. Although a number of competitors had successfully competed with Digital through the 1970s, the VAX cemented the company's place as a leading vendor in the computer space. As microcomputers improved in the late 1980s, especially with the introduction of RISC-based workstation machines, the performance niche of the minicomputer was rapidly eroded.

By the early 1990s, the company was in turmoil as their mini sales collapsed and their attempts to address this by entering the high-end market with machines like the VAX 9000 were market failures. After several attempts to enter the workstation and file server market, the DEC Alpha product line began to make successful inroads in the mid-1990s, but was too late to save the company. DEC was acquired in June 1998 by Compaq in what was at that time the largest merger in the history of the computer industry. During the purchase, some parts of DEC were sold to other companies; the compiler business and the Hudson Fab were sold to Intel. At the time, Compaq was focused on the enterprise market and had recently purchased several other large vendors. DEC was a major player overseas where Compaq had less presence. However, Compaq had little idea what to do with its acquisitions, and soon found itself in financial difficulty of its own. Compaq was eventually bought by Hewlett-Packard (HP) in May 2002.

== History ==
=== Origins (1944–1958) ===
Original Digital Equipment Corporation logo designed by Elliot Hendrickson in 1957, used from 1957 to 1993

Alternate logo, briefly used concurrently

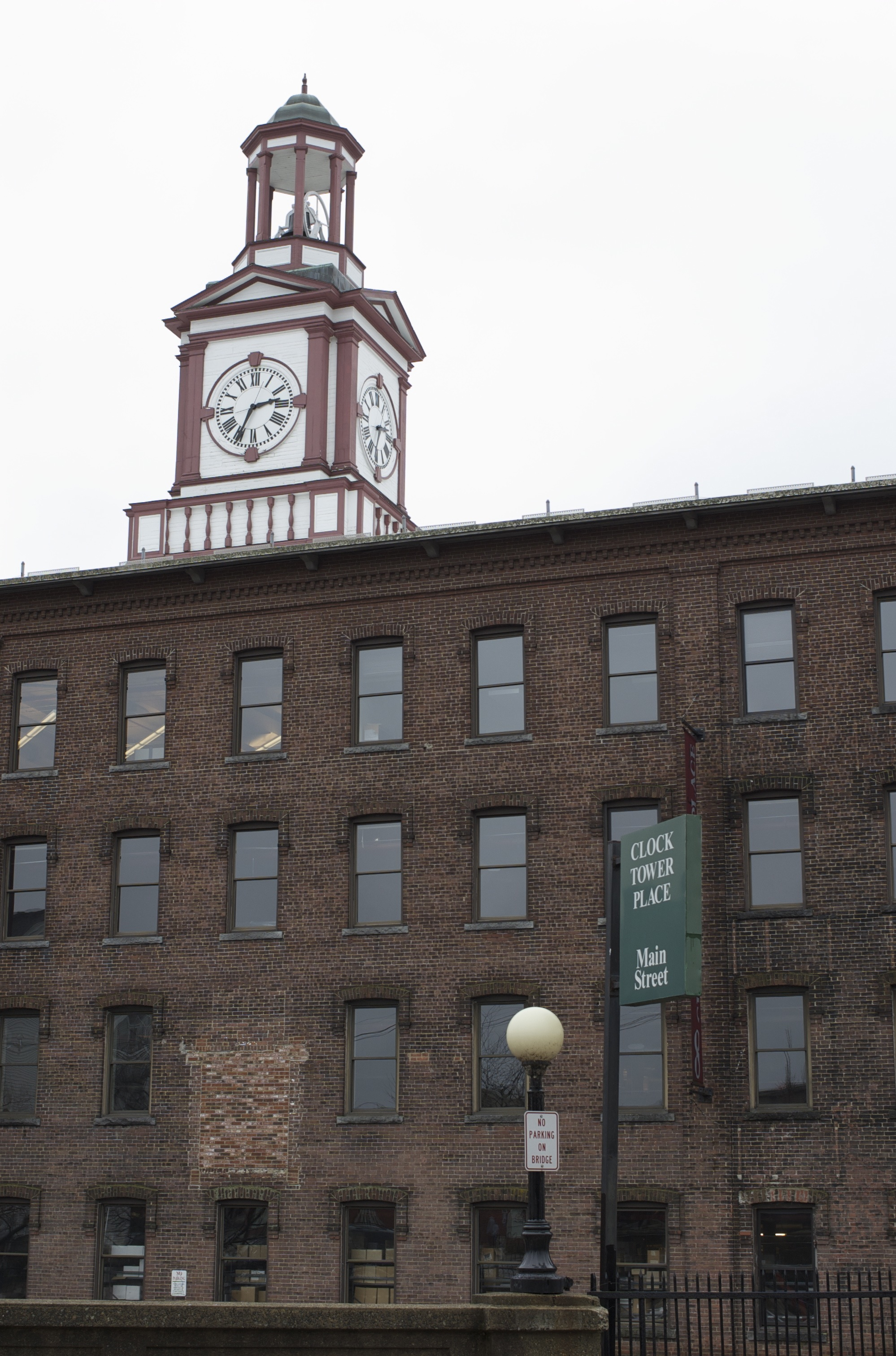
DEC was headquartered at a former wool mill in Maynard, Massachusetts, from 1957 until 1992.

Ken Olsen and Harlan Anderson were two engineers who had been working at MIT Lincoln Laboratory on the lab's various computer projects. The Lab is best known for their work on what would today be known as "interactivity", and their machines were among the first where operators had direct control over programs running in real-time. These had started in 1944 with the famed Whirlwind, which was originally developed to make a flight simulator for the US Navy, although this was never completed. Instead, this effort evolved into the SAGE system for the US Air Force, which used large screens and light guns to allow operators to interact with radar data stored in the computer.

When the Air Force project wound down, the Lab turned their attention to an effort to build a version of the Whirlwind using transistors in place of vacuum tubes. In order to test their new circuitry, they first built a small 18-bit machine known as TX-0, which first ran in 1956. When the TX-0 successfully proved the basic concepts, attention turned to a much larger system, the 36-bit TX-2 with a then-enormous 64 kWords of core memory. Core was so expensive that parts of TX-0's memory were stripped for the TX-2, and what remained of the TX-0 was then given to MIT on permanent loan.

At MIT, Ken Olsen and Harlan Anderson noticed something odd: students would line up for hours to get a turn to use the stripped-down TX-0, while largely ignoring a faster IBM machine that was also available. The two decided that the draw of interactive computing was so strong that they felt there was a market for a small machine dedicated to this role, essentially a commercialized TX-0. They could sell this to users where the graphical output or real-time operation would be more important than outright performance. Additionally, as the machine would cost much less than the larger systems then available, it would also be able to serve users that needed a lower-cost solution dedicated to a specific task, where a larger 36-bit machine would not be needed.

In 1957, when the pair and Ken's brother Stan sought capital, they found that the American business community was hostile to investing in computer companies. Many smaller computer companies had come and gone in the 1950s, wiped out when new technical developments rendered their platforms obsolete, and even large companies like RCA and General Electric were failing to make a profit in the market. The only serious expression of interest came from Georges Doriot and his American Research and Development Corporation (AR&D). Worried that a new computer company would find it difficult to arrange further financing, Doriot suggested the fledgling company change its business plan to focus less on computers, and even change their name from "Digital Computer Corporation".

The pair returned with an updated business plan that outlined two phases for the company's development. They would start by selling computer modules as stand-alone devices that could be purchased separately and wired together to produce a number of different digital systems for lab use. Then, if these "digital modules" were able to build a self-sustaining business, the company would be free to use them to develop a complete computer in its Phase II. The newly christened "Digital Equipment Corporation" received $70,000 from AR&D for a 70% share of the company, AR&D's SVP Dorothy Rowe joined as a Director and also served as Treasurer, and the company began operations in a Civil War-era textile mill in Maynard, Massachusetts, where plenty of inexpensive manufacturing space was available.

=== Digital modules (1958) ===
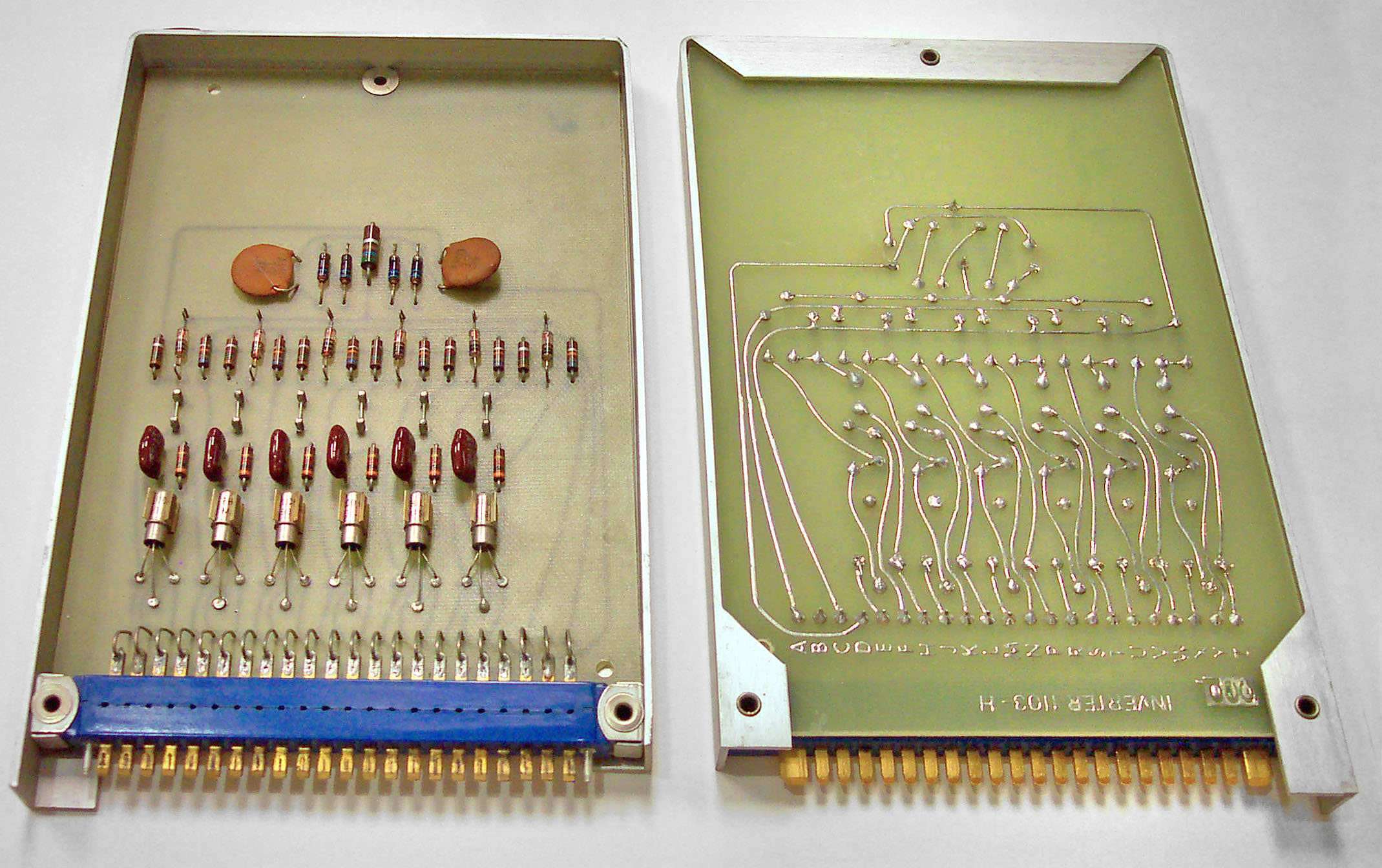
System Building Blocks (System Module) 1103 hex-inverter card (both sides)

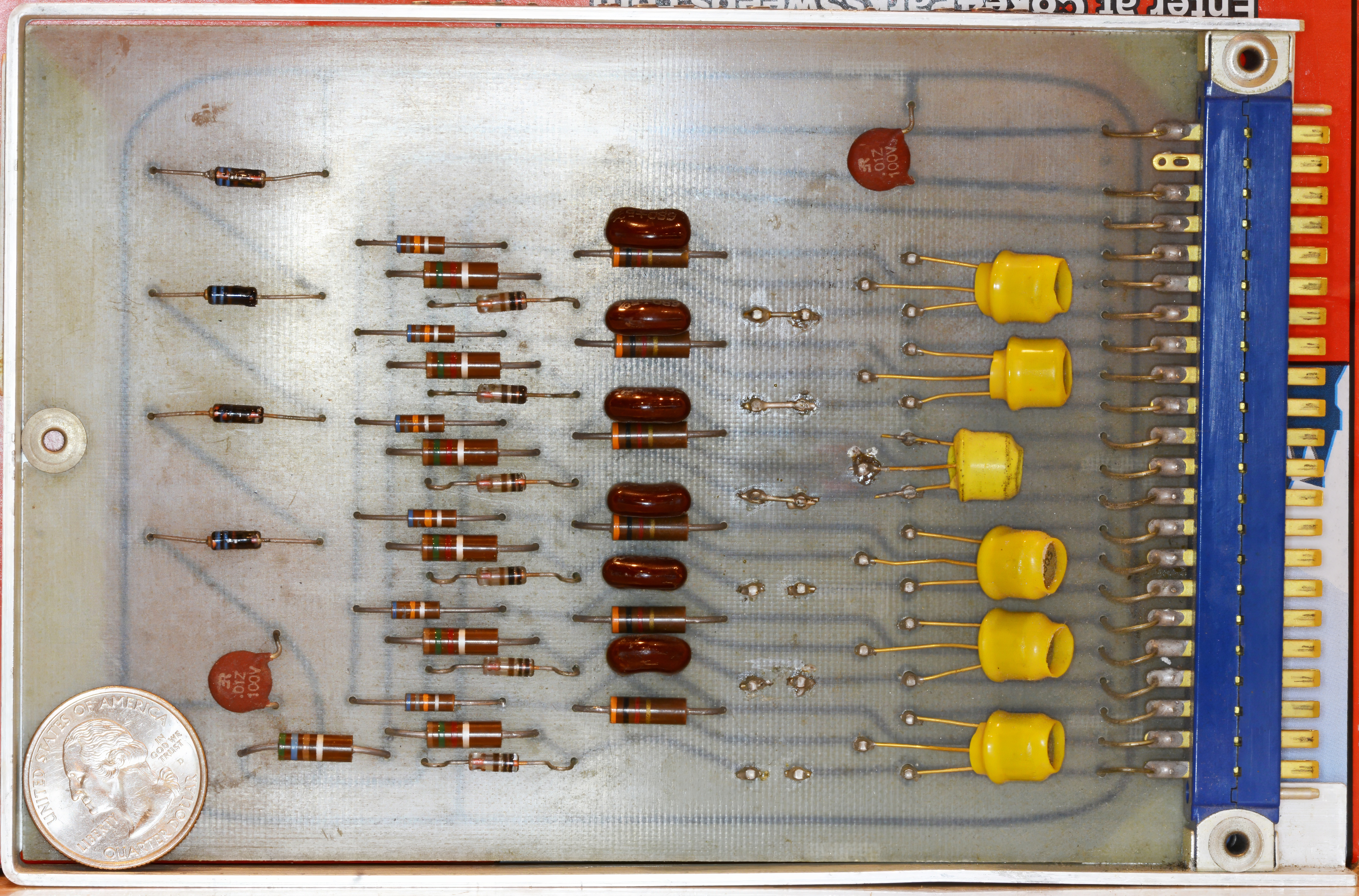
PDP-1 System Building Block #4106, circa 1963 - note that one transistor (yellow) has been replaced

In early 1958, DEC shipped its first products, the "Digital Laboratory Module" line. The Modules consisted of a number of individual electronic components and germanium transistors mounted to a circuit board, the actual circuits being based on those from the TX-2.

The Laboratory Modules were packaged in an extruded aluminum housing, intended to sit on an engineer's workbench, although a rack-mount bay was sold that held nine laboratory modules. They were then connected together using banana plug patch cords inserted at the front of the modules. Three versions were offered, running at 5 MHz (1957), 500 kHz (1959), or 10 MHz (1960). The Modules proved to be in high demand by other computer companies, who used them to build equipment to test their own systems. Despite the recession of the late 1950s, the company sold $94,000 worth of these modules during 1958 alone (equivalent to $1,049,000 in 2025), turning a profit at the end of its first year.

The original Laboratory Modules were soon supplemented with the "Digital System Module" line, which were identical internally but packaged differently. The Systems Modules were designed with all of the connections at the back of the module using 22-pin Amphenol connectors, and were attached to each other by plugging them into a backplane that could be mounted in a 19-inch rack. The backplanes allowed 25 modules in a single 5-1/4 inch section of rack, and allowed the high densities needed to build a computer.

The original laboratory and system module lines were offered in 500 kilocycle, 5 megacycle and 10 megacycle versions. In all cases, the supply voltages were -15 and +10 volts, with logic levels of -3 volts (passive pull-down) and 0 volts (active pull-up).

DEC used the System Modules to build their "Memory Test" machine for testing core memory systems, selling about 50 of these pre-packaged units over the next eight years. The PDP-1 and LINC computers were also built using System Modules (see below).

Modules were part of DEC's product line into the 1970s, although they went through several evolutions during this time as technology changed. The same circuits were then packaged as the first "R" (red) series "Flip-Chip" modules. Later, other Flip-Chip module series provided additional speed, much higher logic density, and industrial I/O capabilities. DEC published extensive data about the modules in free catalogs that became very popular.

=== PDP-1 family (1960) ===
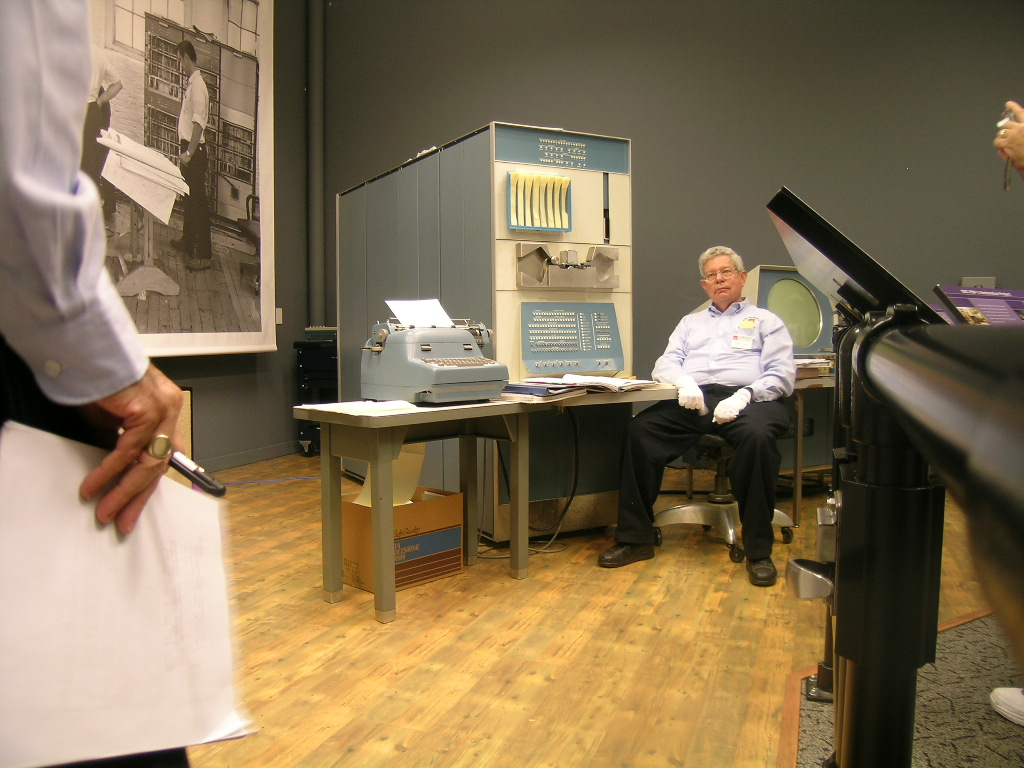
A PDP-1 system, with Steve Russell, developer of Spacewar!, at the console. This is a canonical example of the PDP-1, with the console typewriter on the left, CPU and main control panel in the center, the Type 30 display on the right.

With the company established and a successful product on the market, DEC turned its attention to the computer market once again as part of its planned "Phase II". In August 1959, Ben Gurley started design of the company's first computer, the PDP-1. In keeping with Doriot's instructions, the name was an initialism for "Programmable Data Processor", leaving off the term "computer". As Gurley put it, "We aren't building computers, we're building 'Programmable Data Processors'." The prototype was first shown publicly at the Joint Computer Conference in Boston in December 1959. The first PDP-1 was delivered to Bolt, Beranek and Newman in November 1960, and formally accepted the next April. The PDP-1 sold in basic form for $120,000 (equivalent to $1,292,873 in 2025). By the time production ended in 1969, 53 PDP-1s had been delivered.

The PDP-1 was supplied standard with 4096 words of core memory, 18-bits per word, and ran at a basic speed of 100,000 operations per second. It was constructed using many System Building Blocks that were packaged into several 19-inch racks. The racks were themselves packaged into a single large mainframe case, with a hexagonal control panel containing switches and lights mounted to lie at table-top height at one end of the mainframe. Above the control panel was the system's standard input/output solution, a punched tape reader and writer. Most systems were purchased with two peripherals, the Type 30 vector graphics display, and a Soroban Engineering modified IBM Model B Electric typewriter that was used as a printer. The Soroban system was notoriously unreliable, and often replaced with a modified Friden Flexowriter, which also contained its own punched tape system. A variety of more-expensive add-ons followed, including magnetic tape systems, punched card readers and punches, and faster punched tape and printer systems.

When DEC introduced the PDP-1, they also mentioned larger machines at 24, 30 and 36 bits, based on the same design. During construction of the prototype PDP-1, some design work was carried out on a 24-bit PDP-2, and the 36-bit PDP-3. Although the PDP-2 never proceeded beyond the initial design, the PDP-3 found some interest and was designed in full. Only one PDP-3 appears to have been built, in 1960, by the CIA's Scientific Engineering Institute (SEI) in Waltham, Massachusetts. According to the limited information available, they used it to process radar cross section data for the Lockheed A-12 reconnaissance aircraft. Gordon Bell remembered that it was being used in Oregon some time later, but could not recall who was using it.

In November 1962, DEC introduced the $65,000 PDP-4. The PDP-4 was similar to the PDP-1 and used a similar instruction set, but used slower memory and different packaging to lower the price. Like the PDP-1, about 54 PDP-4s were eventually sold, most to a customer base similar to the original PDP-1.

In 1964, DEC introduced its new Flip-Chip module design, and used it to re-implement the PDP-4 as the PDP-7. The PDP-7 was introduced in December 1964, and about 120 were eventually produced. An upgrade to the Flip Chip led to the R series, which in turn led to the PDP-7A in 1965. The PDP-7 is most famous as the machine for which the Unix operating system was originally written. Unix ran only on DEC systems until the Interdata 8/32.

A more dramatic upgrade to the PDP-1 series was introduced in August 1966, the PDP-9. The PDP-9 was instruction-compatible with the PDP-4 and −7, but ran about twice as fast as the −7 and was intended to be used in larger deployments. At only $19,900 in 1968, the PDP-9 was a big seller, eventually selling 445 machines, more than all of the earlier models combined.

Even while the PDP-9 was being introduced, its replacement was being designed, and was introduced as 1969's PDP-15, which re-implemented the PDP-9 using integrated circuits in place of modules. Much faster than the PDP-9 even in basic form, the PDP-15 also included a floating-point unit and a separate input/output processor for further performance gains. Over 400 PDP-15's were ordered in the first eight months of production, and production eventually amounted to 790 examples in 12 basic models. However, by this time other machines in DEC's lineup could fill the same niche at even lower prices, and the PDP-15 would be the last of the 18-bit series.

=== PDP-8 family (1962) ===
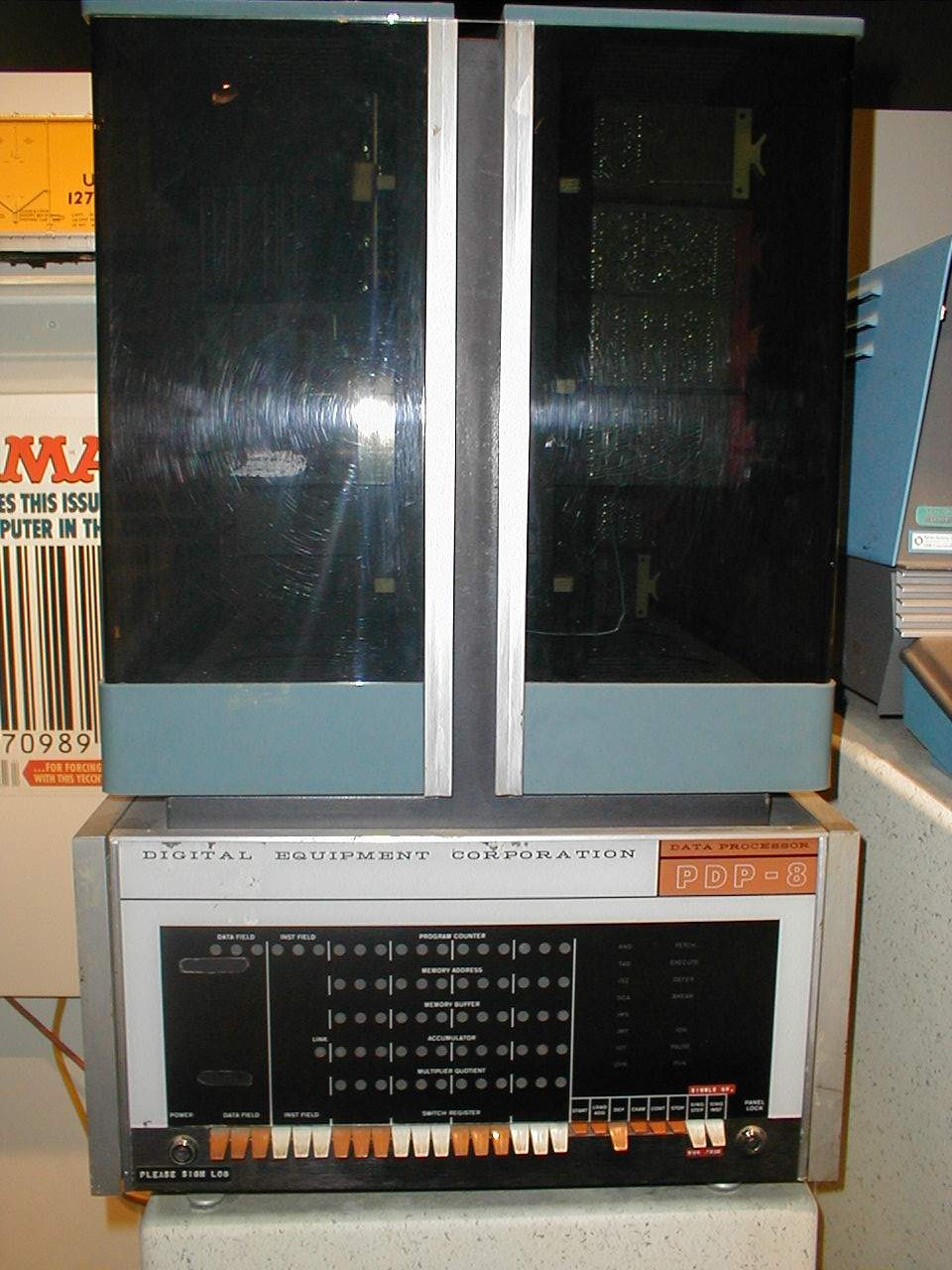
A PDP-8 on display at the Smithsonian's National Museum of American History in Washington, D.C. This example is from the first generation of PDP-8s, built with discrete transistors and later known as the Straight 8.

In 1962, Lincoln Laboratory used a selection of System Building Blocks to implement a small 12-bit machine, and attached it to a variety of analog-to-digital (A to D) input/output (I/O) devices that made it easy to interface with various analog lab equipment. The LINC proved to attract intense interest in the scientific community, and has since been referred to as the first real minicomputer, a machine that was small and inexpensive enough to be dedicated to a single task even in a small lab.

Seeing the success of the LINC, in 1963 DEC took the basic logic design but stripped away the extensive A to D systems to produce the PDP-5. The new machine, the first outside the PDP-1 mould, was introduced at WESCON on August 11, 1963. A 1964 ad expressed the main advantage of the PDP-5, "Now you can own the PDP-5 computer for what a core memory alone used to cost: $27,000". 116 PDP-5s were produced until the lines were shut down in early 1967. Like the PDP-1 before it, the PDP-5 inspired a series of newer models based on the same basic design that would go on to be more famous than its parent.

On March 22, 1965, DEC introduced the PDP-8, which replaced the PDP-5's modules with the new R-series modules using Flip Chips. The machine was re-packaged into a small tabletop case, which remains distinctive for its use of smoked plastic over the CPU which allowed one to easily see the logic modules plugged into the wire-wrapped backplane of the CPU. Sold standard with 4 kWords of 12-bit core memory and a Teletype Model 33 ASR for basic input/output, the machine listed for only $18,000. The PDP-8 is referred to as the first real minicomputer because of its sub-$25,000 price. Sales were, unsurprisingly, very strong, and helped by the fact that several competitors had just entered the market with machines aimed directly at the PDP-5's market space, which the PDP-8 trounced. This gave the company two years of unrestricted leadership, and eventually 1450 "straight eight" machines were produced before it was replaced by newer implementations of the same basic design.

DEC hit an even lower price with the PDP-8/S, the S for "serial". As the name implies the /S used a serial arithmetic unit, which was much slower but reduced costs so much that the system sold for under $10,000. DEC then used the new PDP-8 design as the basis for a new LINC, the two-processor LINC-8. The LINC-8 used one PDP-8 CPU and a separate LINC CPU, and included instructions to switch from one to the other. This allowed customers to run their existing LINC programs, or "upgrade" to the PDP-8, all in software. Although not a huge seller, 142 LINC-8s were sold starting at $38,500. Like the original LINC to PDP-5 evolution, the LINC-8 was then modified into the single-processor PDP-12, adding another 1000 machines to the 12-bit family. Newer circuitry designs led to the PDP-8/I and PDP-8/L in 1968. In 1975, one year after an agreement between DEC and Intersil, the Intersil 6100 chip was launched, effectively a PDP-8 on a chip. This was a way to allow PDP-8 software to be run even after the official end-of-life announcement for the DEC PDP-8 product line.

=== PDP-6 and PDP-10 families (1963 and 1968) ===
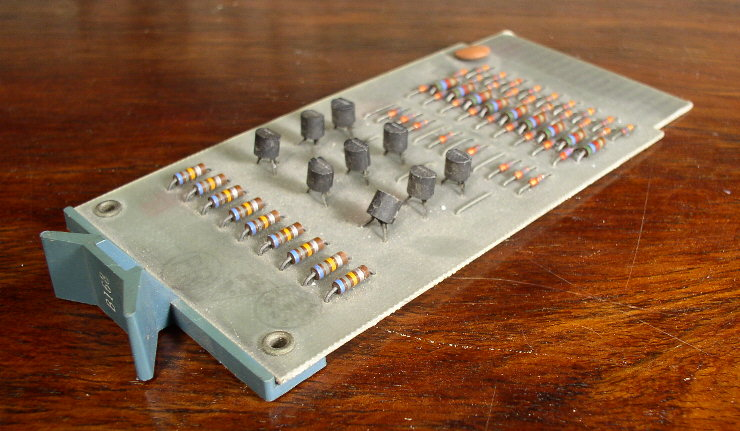
A "B" (blue) series Flip Chip module containing nine transistors, 1971

While the PDP-5 introduced a lower-cost line, 1963's PDP-6 was intended to take DEC into the mainframe market with a 36-bit machine. However, the PDP-6 proved to be a "hard sell" with customers, as it offered few obvious advantages over similar machines from the better-established vendors like IBM or Honeywell, in spite of its low cost around $300,000. Only 23 were sold, or 26 depending on the source, and unlike other models the low sales meant the PDP-6 was not improved with successor versions. However, the PDP-6 is historically important as the platform that introduced "Monitor", an early time-sharing operating system that would evolve into the widely used TOPS-10.

When newer Flip Chip packaging allowed the PDP-6 to be re-implemented at a much lower cost, DEC took the opportunity to refine their 36-bit design, introducing the PDP-10 in 1968. The PDP-10 was as much a success as the PDP-6 was a commercial failure; about 700 mainframe PDP-10s were sold before production ended in 1984. The PDP-10 was widely used in university settings, and thus was the basis of many advances in computing and operating system design during the 1970s. DEC later re-branded all of the models in the 36-bit series as the "DECsystem-10", and PDP-10s are generally referred to by the model of their CPU, starting with the "KA10", soon upgraded to the "KI10" (I:Integrated circuit); then to "KL10" (L:Large-scale integration ECL logic); also the "KS10" (S: Small form factor). Unified product line upgrades produced the compatible DECSYSTEM-20, along with a TOPS-20 operating system that included virtual memory support.

The Jupiter Project was supposed to continue the mainframe product line into the future by using gate arrays with an innovative Air Mover Cooling System, coupled with a built-in floating point processing engine called "FBOX". The design was intended for a top tier scientific computing niche, yet the critical performance measurement was based upon COBOL compilation which did not fully utilize the primary design features of Jupiter technology. When the Jupiter Project was cancelled in 1983, some of the engineers adapted aspects of the 36-bit design into a forthcoming 32-bit design, releasing the high-end VAX8600 in 1985.

=== PDP-11 (1970) ===
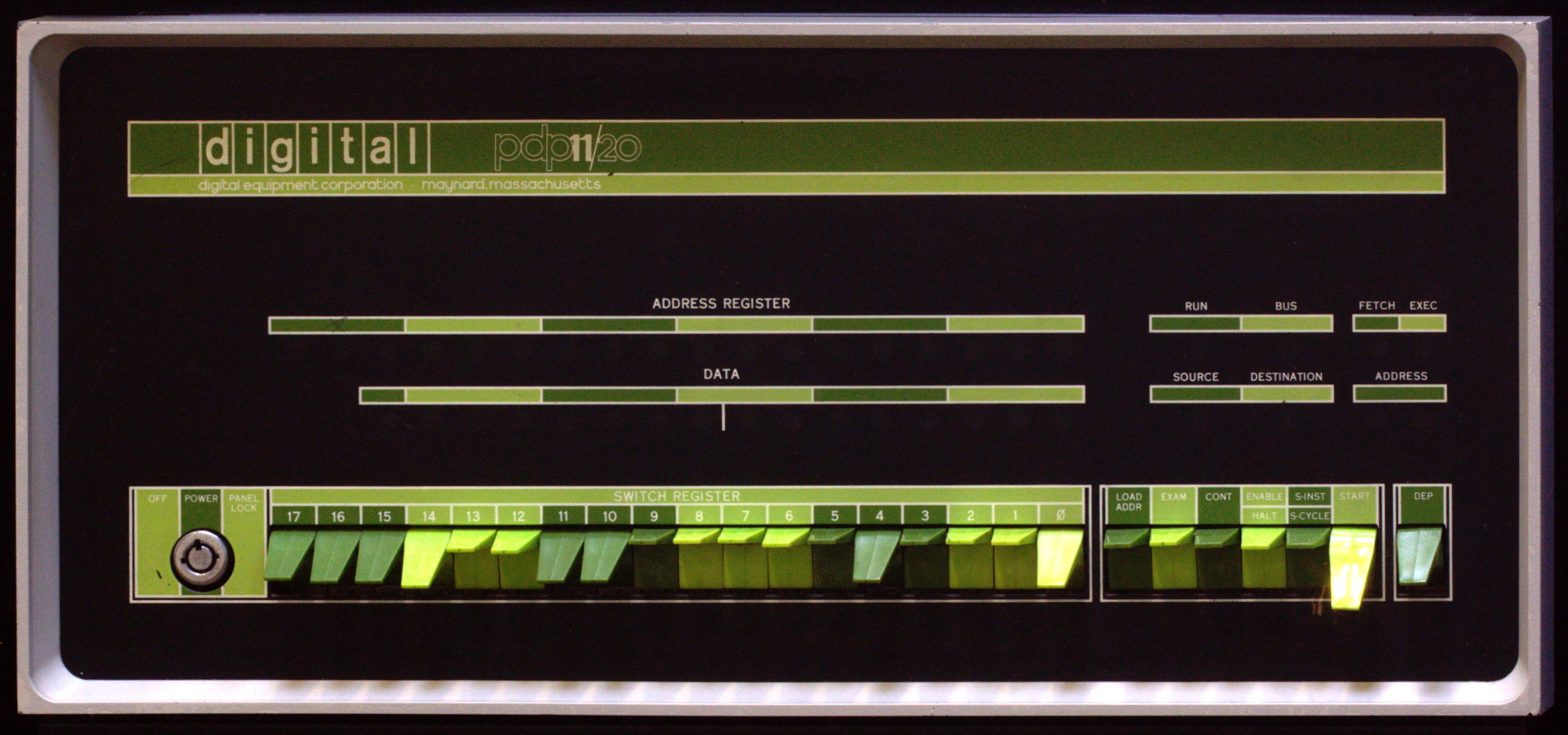
PDP-11/20, the first model of PDP-11 on display at EPFL

DEC's successful entry into the computer market took place during a fundamental shift in the underlying organization of the machines from word lengths based on 6-bit characters to those based on 8-bit words needed to support ASCII. (Note: Although ASCII is a 7-bit standard, units-of-8-bits are typically used for machines that support it.) DEC began studies of such a machine, the PDP-X, but Ken Olsen did not support it as he could not see how it offered anything their existing 12-bit or 18-bit machines didn't. This led the leaders of the PDP-X project to leave DEC and start Data General, whose 16-bit Data General Nova was released in 1969 and was a huge success.

The success of the Nova finally prompted DEC to take the switch seriously, and they began a crash program to introduce a 16-bit machine of their own. The new system was designed primarily by Harold McFarland, Gordon Bell, Roger Cady, and others. The project was able to leap forward in design with the arrival of Harold McFarland, who had been researching 16-bit designs at Carnegie Mellon University. One of his simpler designs became the basis for the new design, although when they first viewed the proposal, management was not impressed and almost cancelled it.

The result was the PDP-11, released in 1970. It differed from earlier designs considerably. In particular, the new design did not include many of the addressing modes that were intended to make programs smaller in memory, a technique that was widely used on other DEC machines and CISC designs in general. This would mean the machine would spend more time accessing memory, which would slow it down. However, the machine also extended the idea of multiple "General Purpose Registers" (GPRs), which gave the programmer flexibility to use these high-speed memory caches as they needed, potentially addressing the performance issues.

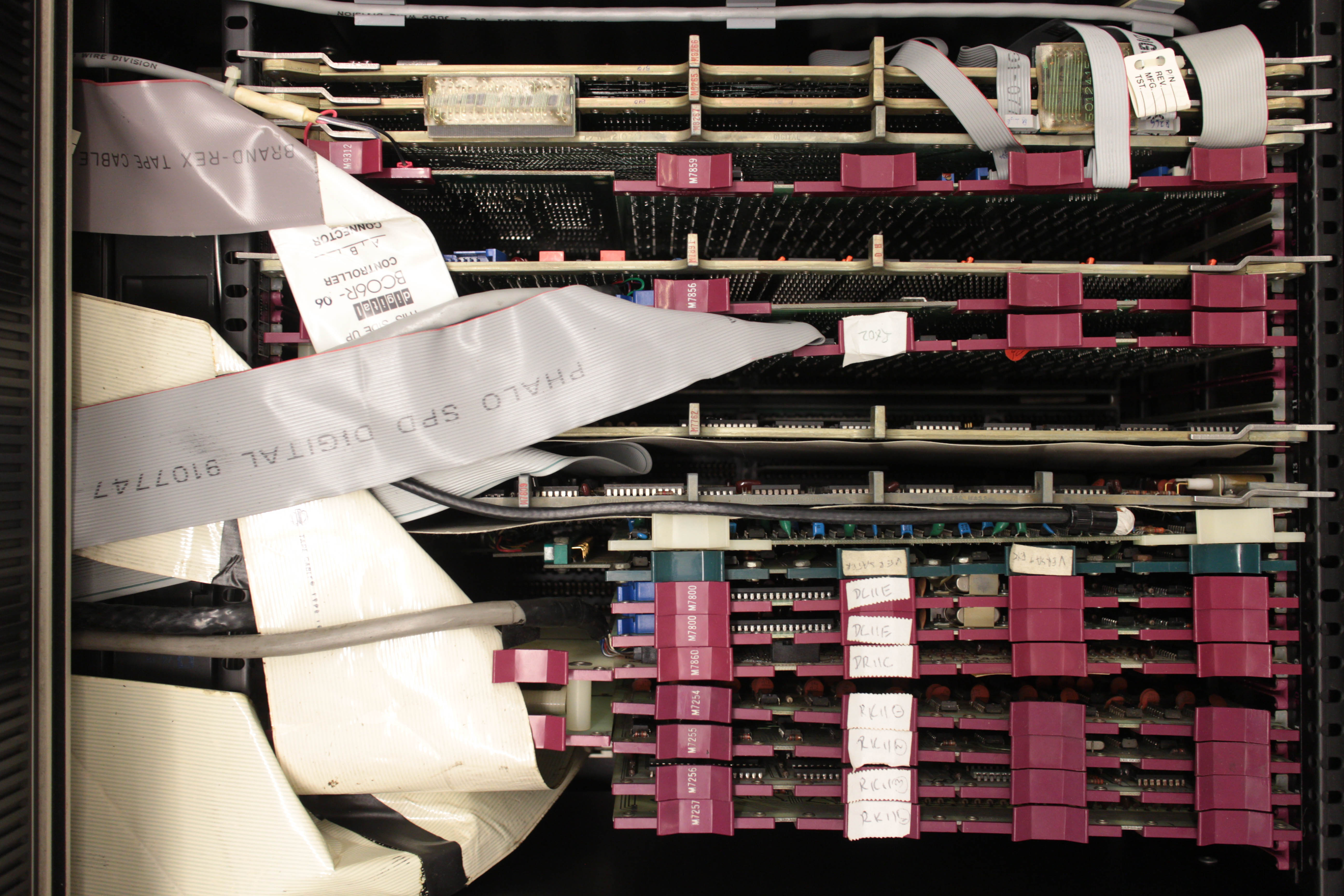
PDP-11/34 top view, showing the Unibus slots with the CPU, DK drive controller and other options

A major advance in the PDP-11 design was DEC's Unibus, which supported all peripherals through memory mapping. This allowed a new device to be added easily, generally only requiring plugging a hardware interface board into the backplane and possibly adding a jumper to the wire wrapped backplane, and then installing software that read and wrote to the mapped memory to control it. The relative ease of interfacing spawned a huge market of third party add-ons for the PDP-11, which made the machine even more useful.

The combination of architectural innovations proved superior to competitors and the "11" architecture was soon the industry leader, propelling DEC back to a strong market position. The design was later expanded to allow paged physical memory and memory protection features, useful for multitasking and time-sharing. Some models supported separate instruction and data spaces for an effective virtual address size of 128 KB within a physical address size of up to 4 MB. Smaller PDP-11s, implemented as single-chip CPUs, continued to be produced until 1996, by which time over 600,000 had been sold.

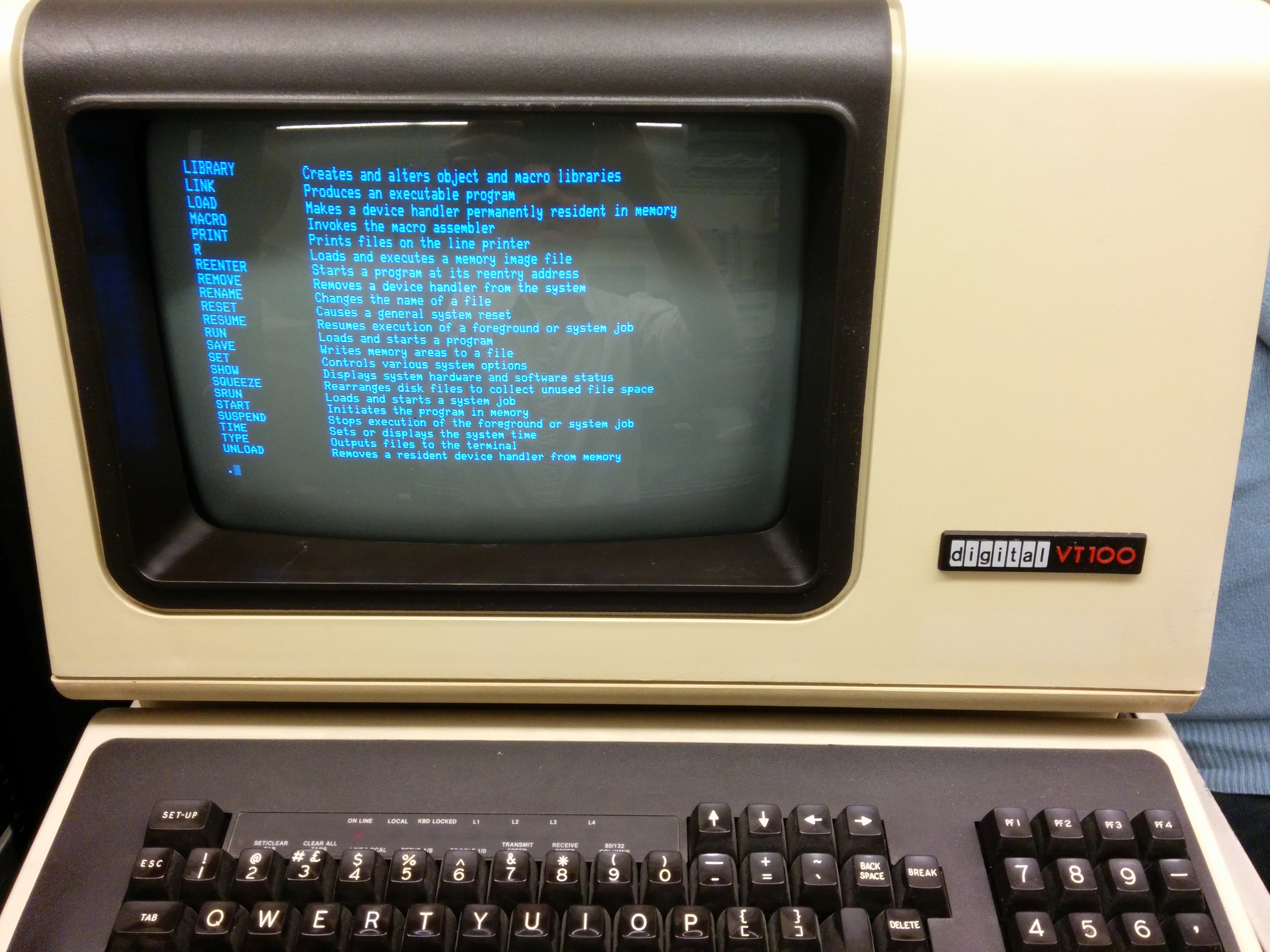
The RT-11 interactive help screen displayed on a VT100 display terminal

The PDP-11 supported several operating systems, including Bell Labs' new Unix operating system as well as DEC's DOS-11, RSX-11, IAS, RT-11, DSM-11, and RSTS/E. Many early PDP-11 applications were developed using standalone paper-tape utilities. DOS-11 was the PDP-11's first disk operating system, but was soon supplanted by more capable systems. RSX provided a general-purpose multitasking environment and supported a wide variety of programming languages. IAS was a time-sharing version of RSX-11D. Both RSTS and Unix were time-sharing systems available to educational institutions at little or no cost, and these PDP-11 systems were destined to be the "sandbox" for a rising generation of engineers and computer scientists. Large numbers of PDP-11/70s were deployed in telecommunications and industrial control applications. AT&T Corporation became DEC's largest customer.

RT-11 provided a practical real-time operating system in minimal memory, allowing the PDP-11 to continue DEC's critical role as a computer supplier for embedded systems. Historically, RT-11 also served as the inspiration for many microcomputer OS's, as these were generally being written by programmers who cut their teeth on one of the many PDP-11 models. For example, CP/M used a command syntax similar to RT-11's, and even retained the awkward PIP program used to copy data from one computer device to another. As another historical footnote, DEC's use of "/" for "switches" (command-line options) would lead to the adoption of "\" for pathnames in MS-DOS and Microsoft Windows as opposed to "/" in Unix.

The evolution of the PDP-11 followed earlier systems, eventually including a single-user deskside personal computer form, the MicroPDP-11. In total, around 600,000 PDP-11s of all models were sold, and a wide variety of third-party peripheral vendors had also entered the computer product ecosystem. It was even sold in kit form as the Heathkit H11, although it proved too expensive for Heathkit's traditional hobbyist market.

=== VAX (1977) ===
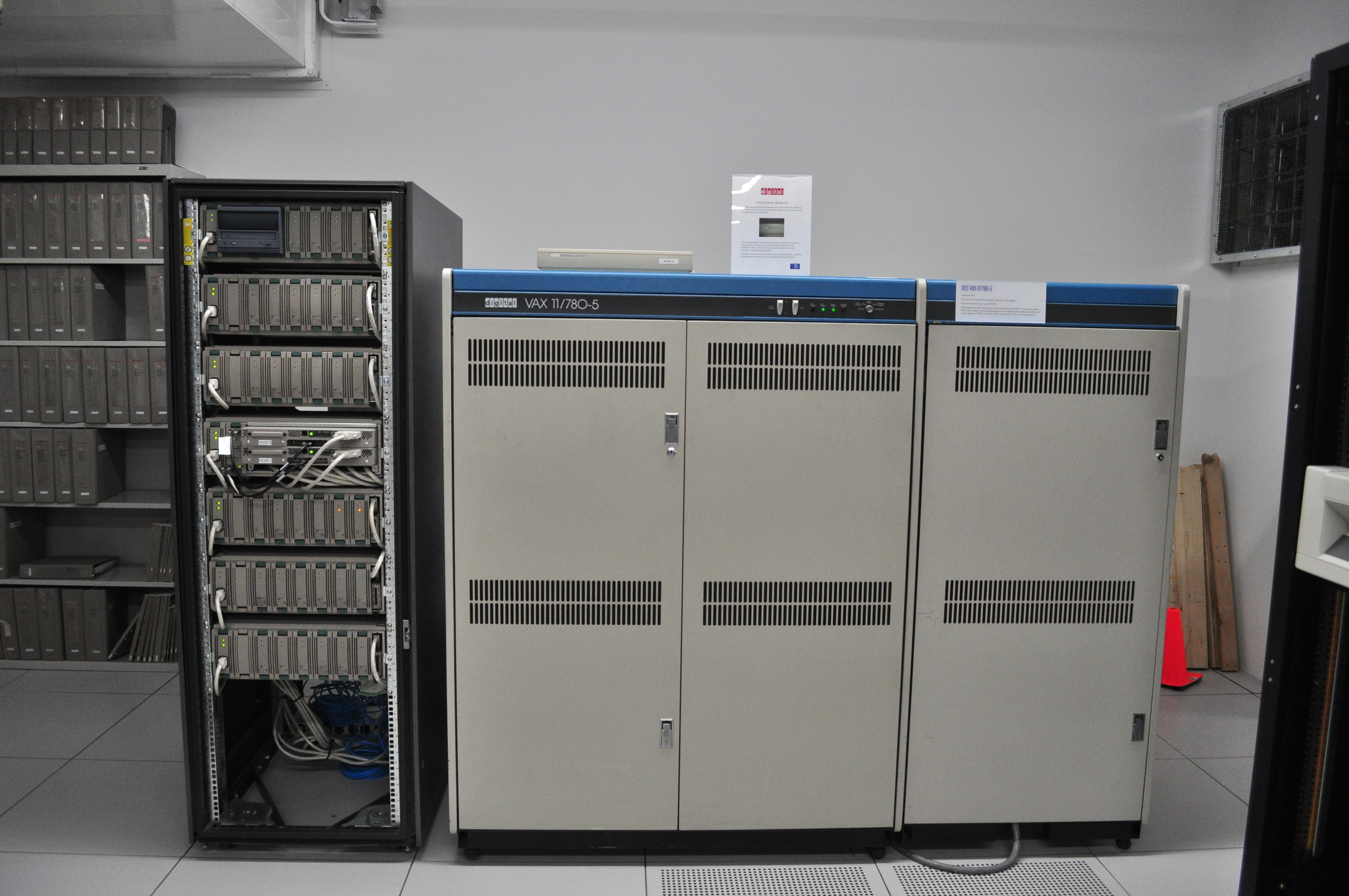
DEC VAX 11/780-5 at Living Computers: Museum + Labs

The introduction of semiconductor memory in the early 1970s, and especially dynamic RAM shortly thereafter, led to dramatic reductions in the price of memory as the effects of Moore's Law were felt. Within years, it was common to equip a machine with all the memory it could address, typically 64 KB on 16-bit machines. This led vendors to introduce new designs with the ability to address more memory, often by extending the address format to 18 or 24 bits in machines that were otherwise similar to their earlier 16-bit designs. (Note: An example is the DG Nova 840, which used a 17-bit format, up from the previous 15-bits.)

In contrast, DEC decided to make a more radical departure. In 1976, they began the design of a machine whose entire architecture was expanded from the 16-bit PDP-11 to a new 32-bit basis. This would allow the addressing of very large memories, which were to be controlled by a new virtual memory system, and would also improve performance by processing twice as much data at a time. The system would, however, maintain compatibility with the PDP-11, by operating in a second mode that sent its 16-bit words into the 32-bit internals, while mapping the PDP-11's 16-bit memory space into the larger virtual 32-bit space.

The result was the VAX architecture, where VAX stands for Virtual Address eXtension (from 16 to 32 bits). The first computer to use a VAX CPU was the VAX-11/780, announced in October 1977, which DEC referred to as a superminicomputer. Although it was not the first 32-bit minicomputer, the VAX-11/780's combination of features, price, and marketing almost immediately propelled it to a leadership position in the market after it was released in 1978. VAX systems were so successful that in 1983, DEC canceled its Jupiter project, which had been intended to build a successor to the PDP-10 mainframe, and instead focused on promoting the VAX as the single computer architecture for the company.

Supporting the VAX's success was the VT52, one of the most successful smart terminals. Building on earlier less successful models, the VT05 and VT50, the VT52 was the first terminal that did everything one might want in a single inexpensive chassis. The VT52 was followed by the even more successful VT100 and its follow-ons, making DEC one of the largest terminal vendors in the industry. This was supported by a line of inexpensive computer printers, the DECwriter line. With the VT and DECwriter series, DEC could now offer a complete top-to-bottom system from computer to all peripherals, which formerly required collecting the required devices from different suppliers.

The VAX processor architecture and family of systems evolved and expanded through several generations during the 1980s, culminating in the NVAX microprocessor implementation and VAX 7000/10000 series in the early 1990s.

=== Early microcomputers (1982–1986) ===
When a DEC research group demonstrated two prototype microcomputers in 1974—before the debut of the MITS Altair—Olsen chose to not proceed with the project. The company similarly rejected another personal computer proposal in 1977. At the time these systems were of limited utility, and Olsen famously derided them in 1977, stating "There is no reason for any individual to have a computer in his home." (Note: Olsen later claimed he was referring to home automation, see "Ken Olsen") Unsurprisingly, DEC did not put much effort into the microcomputer area in the early days of the market. In 1977, the Heathkit H11 was announced; a PDP-11 in kit form. At the beginning of the 1980s, DEC built the VT180 (codenamed "Robin"), which was a VT100 terminal with an added Z80-based microcomputer running CP/M, but this product was initially available only to DEC employees.

It was only after IBM had successfully launched the IBM PC in 1981 that DEC responded with their own systems. In 1982, DEC introduced not one, but three incompatible machines which were each tied to different proprietary architectures. The first, the DEC Professional, was based on the PDP-11/23 (and later, the 11/73) running the RSX-11M+ derived, but menu-driven, P/OS ("Professional Operating System"). This DEC machine easily outperformed the PC, but was more expensive than, and completely incompatible with IBM PC hardware and software, offering far fewer options for customizing a system.

Unlike CP/M and DOS microcomputers, every copy of every program for the Professional had to be provided with a unique key for the particular machine and CPU for which it was bought. At that time this was mainstream policy, because most computer software was either bought from the company that built the computer or custom-constructed for one client. However, the emerging third-party software industry disregarded the PDP-11/Professional line and concentrated on other microcomputers where distribution was easier. At DEC itself, creating better programs for the Professional was not a priority, perhaps from fear of cannibalizing the PDP-11 line. As a result, the Professional was a superior machine, running inferior software. In addition, a new user would have to learn an awkward, slow, and inflexible menu-based user interface which appeared to be radically different from PC DOS or CP/M, which were more commonly used on the 8080- and 8088-based microcomputers of the time. A second offering, the DECmate II was the latest version of the PDP-8-based word processors, but not really suited to general computing, nor competitive with Wang Laboratories' popular word processing equipment.

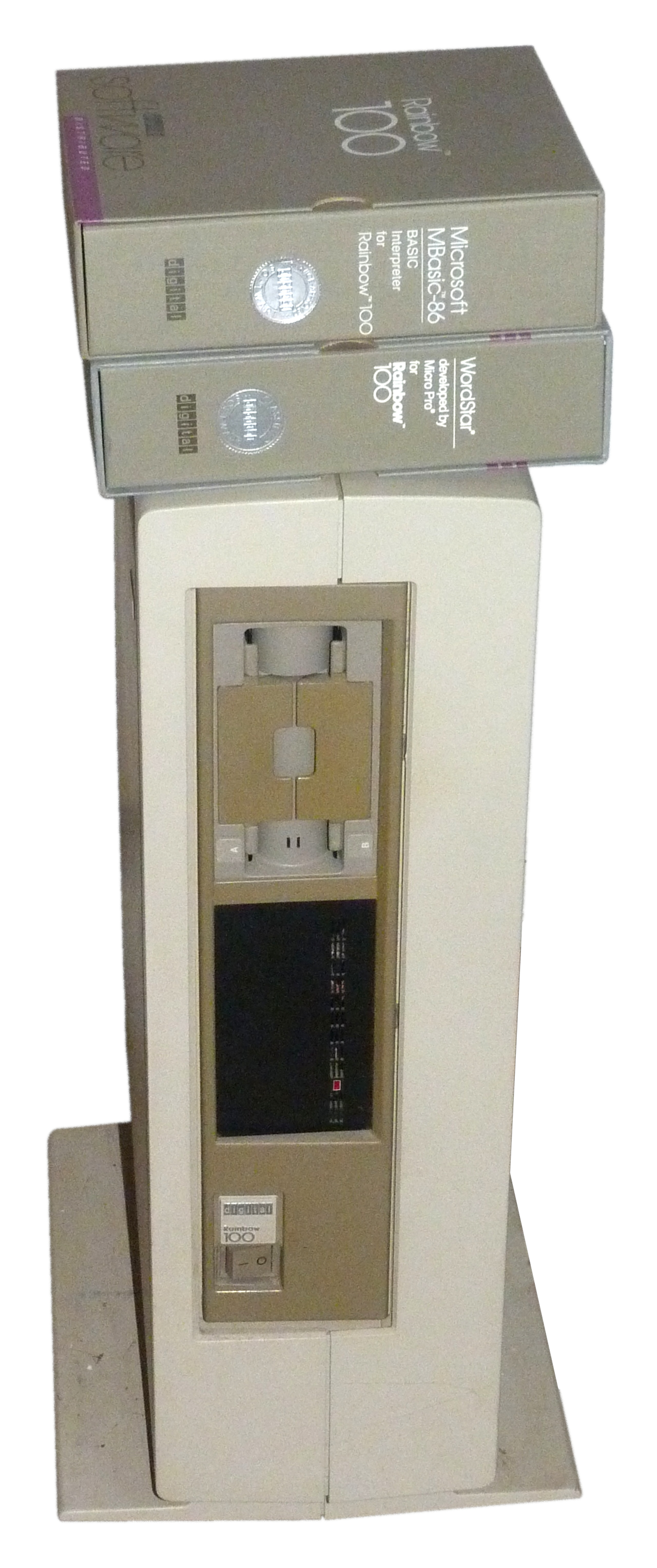
DEC Rainbow 100, floor-mounted

The most popular early DEC microcomputer was the dual-processor (Z80 and 8088) Rainbow 100, which ran the 8-bit CP/M operating system on the Z80 and the 16-bit CP/M-86 operating system on the Intel 8088 processor. It could also run a UNIX System III implementation called VENIX. Applications from standard CP/M could be re-compiled for the Rainbow, but by this time users were expecting custom-built (pre-compiled binary) applications such as Lotus 1-2-3, which was eventually ported along with MS-DOS 2.0 and introduced in late 1983. Although the Rainbow generated some press, it was unsuccessful due to its high price and lack of marketing and sales support. By late 1983 IBM was outselling DEC's personal computers by more than ten to one.

A further system was introduced in 1986 as the VAXmate, which included Microsoft Windows 1.0 and used VAX/VMS-based file and print servers along with integration into DEC's own DECnet-family, providing LAN/WAN connection from PC to mainframe or supermini. The VAXmate replaced the Rainbow, and in its standard form was the first widely marketed diskless workstation.

=== Networking and clusters (1984) ===
In 1984, DEC launched its first 10 Mbit/s Ethernet. Ethernet allowed scalable networking, and VAXcluster allowed scalable computing. Combined with DECnet and Ethernet-based terminal servers (LAT), DEC had produced a networked storage architecture which allowed them to compete directly with IBM. Ethernet replaced Token Ring, and went on to become the dominant networking model in use today.

In September 1985, DEC became the fifth company to register a .com domain name (dec.com).

Along with the hardware and protocols, DEC also introduced the VAXcluster concept, which allowed several VAX machines to be tied together into a single larger storage system. VAXclusters allowed a DEC-based company to scale their services by adding new machines to the cluster at any time, as opposed to buying a faster machine and using that to replace a slower one. The flexibility this offered was compelling, and allowed DEC to attack high-end markets formerly out of their reach.

=== Late 1980s diversification ===
The PDP-11 and VAX lines continued to sell in record numbers. Better yet, DEC was competing very well against the market leader, IBM, taking an estimated $2 billion away from them in the mid-1980s. In 1986, DEC's profits rose 38% when the rest of the computer industry experienced a downturn, and by 1987 the company was threatening IBM's number one position in the computer industry. Not long thereafter came IBM's "VAX killer" offerings, at a time when DEC had twice the sales of IBM in the mid-range computer market.

At its peak, DEC was the second-largest computer company in the world, with over 100,000 employees. It was during this time that the company branched out development into a wide variety of projects that were far from its core business in computer equipment. The company invested heavily in custom software. In the 1970s and earlier, most software was custom-written to serve a specific task, but by the 1980s the introduction of relational databases and similar systems allowed powerful software to be built in a modular fashion, potentially saving enormous amounts of development time. Software companies like Oracle became the new darlings of the industry, and DEC started their own efforts in every "hot" niche, in some cases several projects for the same niche. Some of these products competed with DEC's own partners, notably Rdb which competed with Oracle's products on the VAX, part of a major partnership only a few years earlier.

Although many of these products were well designed, most of them were DEC-only or DEC-centric, and customers frequently ignored them and used third-party products instead. This problem was further exacerbated by Olsen's aversion to traditional advertising and his belief that well-engineered products would sell themselves. Hundreds of millions of dollars were spent on these projects, at the same time that workstations using RISC microprocessors were starting to approach VAX CPUs in performance.

=== Early 1990s faltering and attempted turnaround ===
DEC had forecast that VAX would be a viable platform until about 1999. As microprocessors continued to improve in the 1980s, it soon became clear that the next generation would offer performance and features equal to the best of DECs low-end minicomputer lineup. Worse, the Berkeley RISC and Stanford MIPS designs were aiming to introduce 32-bit designs that would outperform the fastest members of the VAX family, DEC's cash cow.

The company recognized that RISC offered at least twice as many MIPS per cost as VAX, but funded so many competing projects in reaction during the 1980s that DEC lost control of its strategy until the early 1990s. Constrained by the huge success of VAX and VMS, which followed the proprietary model, the company was very late to respond to these threats. In the early 1990s, DEC found its sales faltering and its first layoffs followed. The company that created the minicomputer, a dominant networking technology, and arguably the first computers for personal use, had abandoned the "low end" market, whose dominance with the PDP-8 had built the company in a previous generation. Decisions about what to do about this threat led to infighting within the company that seriously delayed their responses.

One group suggested improved implementations of VAX's CISC design as much as possible. This would limit the market erosion in the top-end segment, where profit margins were maximized and DEC could continue to survive as a minicomputer vendor. This line of thought led, eventually, to the VAX 9000 series, which were plagued with problems when they were first introduced in October 1989, already two years late. The problems took so long to work out, and the prices of the systems were so high, that DEC was never able to make the line a success.

Others within DEC felt that the proper response was to introduce its own RISC design and use those to build new machines. However, there was little official support for these efforts, and no less than four separate small projects ran in parallel at various labs around the US. Eventually these were gathered into the PRISM project, which delivered a credible 32-bit design with some unique features allowing it to serve as the basis of a new VAX implementation. Infighting with teams dedicated to existing products made funding difficult, and the design was not finalized until April 1988, and then cancelled shortly thereafter. The PRISM project was accompanied by the MICA project, intended to consolidate VMS and ULTRIX into a single operating system.

Another group concluded that new workstations like those from Sun Microsystems and Silicon Graphics would take away a large part of DEC's existing customer base before the new VAX systems could address the issues, and that the company needed its own Unix workstation as soon as possible. Fed up with slow progress on both the RISC and VAX fronts, a group in Palo Alto, California started a skunkworks project to introduce their own systems. Selecting the MIPS processor, which was widely available, the DECstation 3100 appeared on January 11, 1989. DECstation would see some success in the market, but were later displaced by similar models running Alpha.

==== 32-bit MIPS and 64-bit Alpha systems (1992) ====
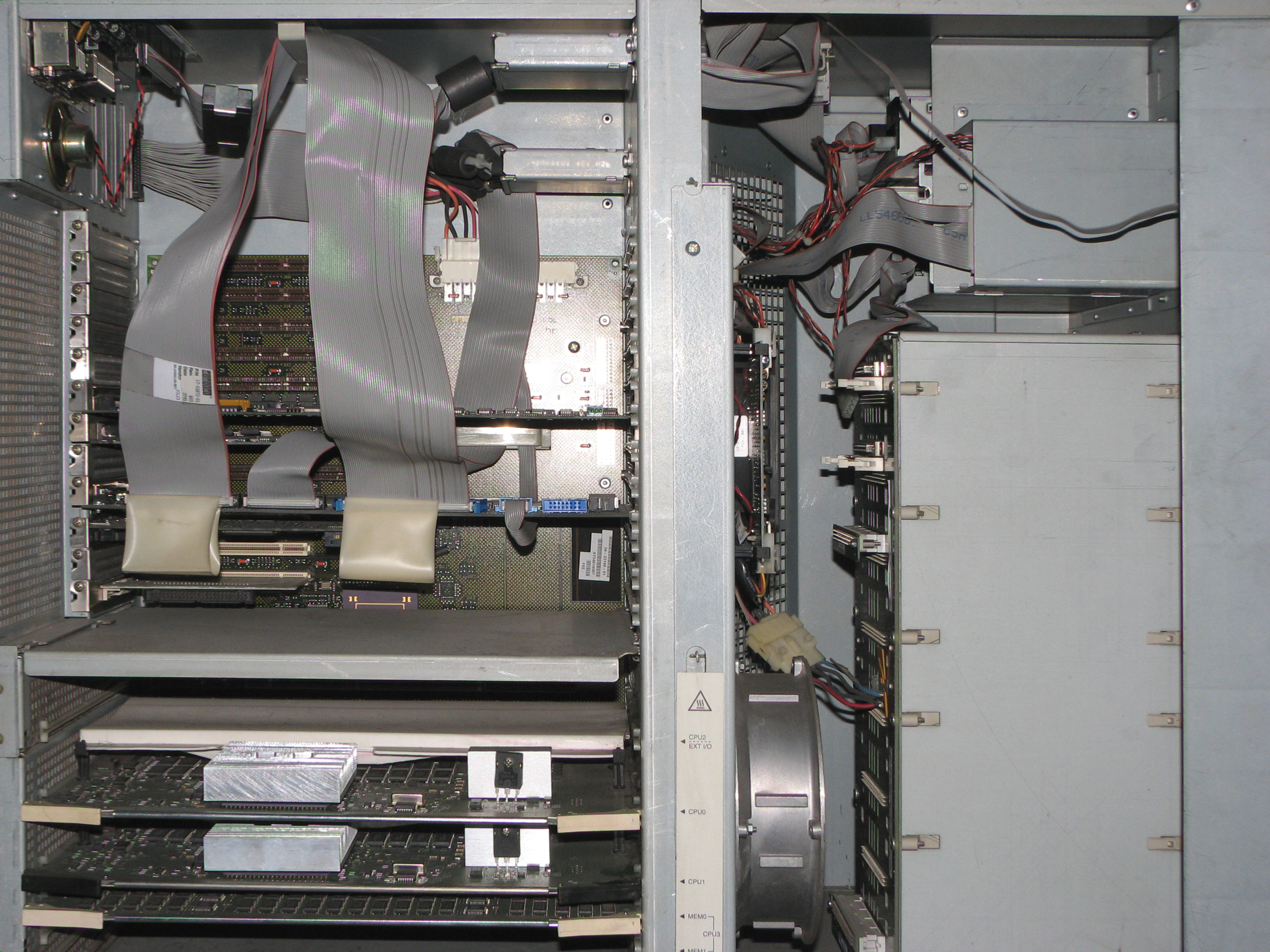
Inside view of AlphaServer 2100

The press described DECstation as a defensive product with which DEC would capture some of the inevitable migration of VAX customers to RISC, even as it and comparable products from rivals would greatly increase the migration. Eventually, in 1992, DEC launched the DECchip 21064 processor, the first implementation of their Alpha instruction set architecture, initially named Alpha AXP; the "AXP" was a "non-acronym" and was later dropped. This was a 64-bit RISC architecture as opposed to the 32-bit CISC architecture used in the VAX. It is one of the first "pure" 64-bit microprocessor architectures and implementations rather than an extension of an earlier 32-bit architecture. The Alpha offered class-leading performance at its launch and was used in the massively-parallel Cray T3D. Subsequent variants continued that performance trend into the 2000s, along with the Alpha-derived Pentium Pro, II, and III CPUs. An AlphaServer SC45 supercomputer was still ranked No. 6 in the world in November 2004. Alpha-based computers comprising the DEC AXP series, later the AlphaStation, and AlphaServer series respectively superseded both the VAX and MIPS architecture in DEC's product lines. They supported OpenVMS, DEC OSF/1 AXP (later known as Digital Unix or Tru64 UNIX) and Microsoft's then-new operating system, Windows NT, an operating system made possible by ex-Digital Equipment Corporation engineers.

In 1998, following the takeover by Compaq Computer Corporation, a decision was made that Microsoft would no longer support and develop Windows NT for the Alpha series computers, a decision that was seen as the beginning of the end for the Alpha series computers.

==== StrongARM (1995) ====
In the mid-1990s, Digital Semiconductor collaborated with ARM Limited to produce the StrongARM microprocessor. This was based in part on ARM7 and in part on DEC technologies like Alpha, and was targeted at embedded systems and portable devices. It was highly compatible with the ARMv4 architecture and was very successful, competing effectively against rivals such as the SuperH and MIPS architectures in the personal digital assistant market. Microsoft subsequently dropped support for these other architectures in their Pocket PC platform. In 1997, as part of a lawsuit settlement, the StrongARM intellectual property was sold to Intel. They continued to produce StrongARM, as well as developing it into the XScale architecture. Intel subsequently sold this business to Marvell Technology Group in 2006.

=== Palmer's reign (1992–1998) ===
Redesigned logo introduced in 1993

At its peak in the late 1980s, DEC had $14 billion in sales and ranked among the most profitable companies in the US. With its strong staff of engineers, DEC was expected to usher in the age of personal computers, but the commonly misunderstood belief then argued by the board to its shareholders was that Mr. Olsen was openly skeptical of the desktop machines, stating "the personal computer will fall flat on its face in business", and regarding them as "toys" used for playing video games. This was made in 1977 about what could be more characterised as home automation devices.

By 1991 DEC was still unable to sell PCs to its customers, which bought them from other vendors like Compaq and HP to use with DEC minicomputers and PATHWORKS. The board forced Olsen to resign as president in July 1992 after two years of losses in operating income. He was replaced by Robert Palmer as the company's president. DEC's board of directors also granted Palmer the title of chief executive officer ("CEO"), a title that had never been used during DEC's 35-year existence. Palmer had joined DEC in 1985 to run Semiconductor Engineering and Manufacturing. His relentless campaign to be CEO, and success with the Alpha microprocessor family, made him a candidate to succeed Olsen. At the same time a more modern logo was designed. Alpha was so important to the company that PC Week wrote of its introduction, "Beleaguered Digital Equipment Corp. will begin this week what may be the fight of its life". DEC was, the magazine said, "undergoing wrenching organization change, including thousands of layoffs". By then DEC was stating when marketing DECpc that while "the Digital of yesterday was not known for competitive prices, this new line of PC offerings is competitive in features and price", and bragging about its more than $1 billion in annual mail order sales.

Palmer restructured DEC into nine business units that reported directly to him. Nonetheless, DEC continued to suffer record losses, including a loss of $260.5 million for the quarter that ended on September 30, 1992. It reported $2.8 billion in losses for its fiscal year 1992. January 5, 1993, saw the retirement of John F. Smith as senior vice president of operations, the second in command at DEC, and his position was not filled. A 35-year company veteran, he had joined DEC in 1958 as the company's 12th employee, passing up a chance to work for Bell Laboratories in New Jersey to work for DEC. Smith rose to become one of the three senior vice presidents in 1987 and was widely considered among the potential successors to Ken Olsen, especially when Smith was appointed chief operating officer in 1991. Smith became a corporate spokesman on financial issues, and had filled in at trouble spots for which Olsen ordered more attention. Smith was passed over in favor of Palmer when Olsen was forced to resign in July 1992, though Smith stayed on for a time to help turn around the struggling company.

In June 1993, Palmer and several of his top lieutenants presented their reorganization plans to applause from the board of directors, and several weeks later DEC reported its first profitable quarter in several years. However, on April 15, 1994, DEC reported a loss of $183 million—three to four times higher than the loss many people on Wall Street had predicted (compared with a loss of $30 million in the comparable period a year earlier), causing the stock price on the NYSE to plunge $5.875 to $23, a 20% drop. The losses at that point totaled $339 million for the current fiscal year. Sales of the VAX, long the company's biggest moneymaker, continued to decline, which in turn also hurt DEC's lucrative service and maintenance business (this made up more than a third of DEC's revenue of $14 billion in the 1993 fiscal year), which declined 11% year over year to $1.5 billion in the most recent quarter.

When Olsen resigned, an industry analyst said "If Alpha fails, DEC is dead". Market acceptance of Alpha computers and chips was slower than the company had hoped, even though Alpha's sales for the quarter estimated at $275 million were up significantly from $165 million in the December quarter. DEC had also made a strong push into personal computers and workstations, which had even lower margins than Alpha computers and chips. Also, DEC was playing catchup with its own Unix offerings for client-server networks, as it long emphasized its own VMS software, while corporate computer users based their client-server networks on the industry-standard Unix software (of which Hewlett-Packard was one of the market leaders). DEC's problems were similar to that of larger rival IBM, due to the fundamental shift in the computer industry that made it unlikely that DEC could ever again operate profitably at its former size of 120,000 employees, and while its workforce had been reduced to 92,000 people many analysts expected that they would have to cut another 20,000.

==== Selloffs ====
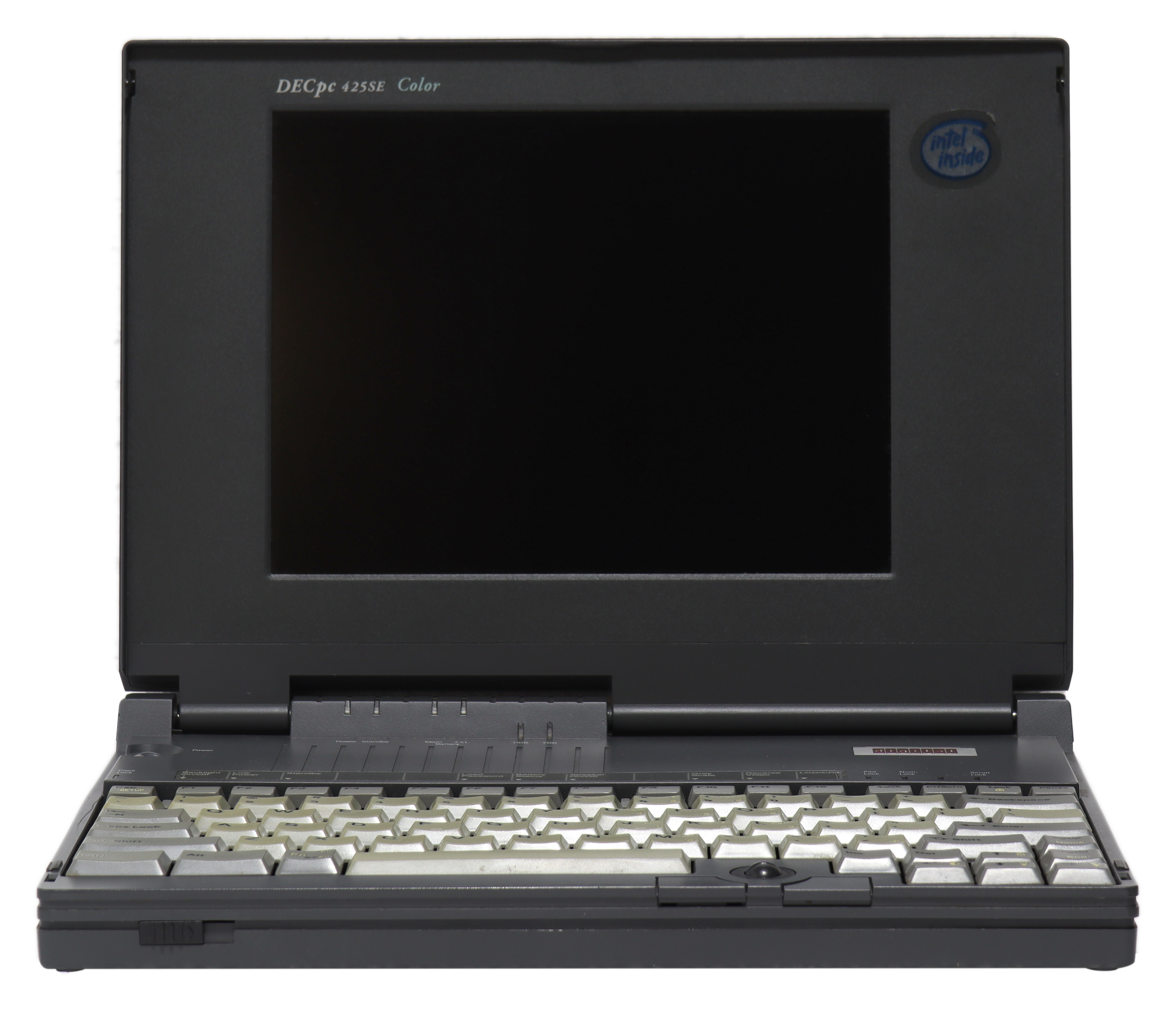
DECpc 425SE Color: a notebook computer released by Digital in 1993

During the profitable years up until the early 1990s, DEC was a company that boasted that it never had a general layoff. Following the 1992 economic downturn, layoffs became regular events as the company continually downsized to try to stay afloat. Palmer was tasked with the goal of bringing DEC back to profitability, which he attempted to do by changing the established DEC business culture, hiring new executives from outside the company, and selling off various non-core business units:

- Worldwide training was spun off to form an independent/new company called Global Knowledge Network.
- Rdb, DEC's database product, was sold to Oracle.
- Rights to the PDP-11 line and several PDP-11 operating systems were sold to Mentec in 1994, though DEC continued to produce some PDP-11 hardware for a few years.
- Disk and DLT technologies was sold to Quantum Corporation in 1994.
- Text terminal business (VT100 and its successors) was sold in August 1995 to Boundless Technologies.
- CORBA-based product, ObjectBroker, and its messaging software, MessageQ, were sold to BEA Systems, Inc in March 1997.
- Printer business was sold in 1997 to GENICOM (now TallyGenicom), which then produced models bearing the Digital logo.
- Networking business was sold c.1997 to Cabletron Systems, and subsequently spun off as Digital Network Products Group.
- DECtalk and DECvoice voice products were spun off, and eventually arrived at Fonix Speech Group.

=== Acquisition by Compaq (1998) ===
Through 1997, DEC began discussions with Compaq on a possible merger. Several years earlier, Compaq had considered a bid for DEC but became seriously interested only after DEC's major divestments and refocusing on the Internet in 1997. At that time, Compaq was making strong moves into the enterprise market, and DEC's multivendor global services organization and customer support centers offered a real opportunity to expand their support and sales worldwide. Compaq was not interested in a number of DEC's product lines, which led to the series of sell-offs. Notable among these was DEC's Hudson Fab, which made most of their custom chips, a market that made little sense to Compaq's "industry standard" marketing. DEC had previously sold its semiconductor plant in South Queensferry to Motorola in 1995, with an understanding that Motorola would continue to produce Alpha processors at the facility, along with continuing a two-year foundry agreement with AMD to continue producing the Am486 processor.

This led to an interesting solution to the problem of selling off the division for a reasonable profit. In May 1997, DEC sued Intel for allegedly infringing on its Alpha patents in designing the original Pentium, Pentium Pro, and Pentium II chips. As part of a settlement, much of DEC's chip design and fabrication business was sold to Intel. This included DEC's StrongARM implementation of the ARM computer architecture, which Intel marketed as the XScale processors commonly used in Pocket PCs. The core of Digital Semiconductor, the Alpha microprocessor group, remained with DEC, while the associated office buildings went to Intel as part of the Hudson fab.

On January 26, 1998, what remained of the company was sold to Compaq in what was the largest merger up to that time in the computer industry. At the time of Compaq's acquisition announcement, DEC had a total of 53,500 employees, down from a peak of 130,000 in the 1980s, but it still employed about 65% more people than Compaq to produce about half the volume of sales revenues. After the merger closed, Compaq moved aggressively to reduce DEC's high selling, general, and administrative (SG&A) costs (equal to 24% of total 1997 revenues) and bring them more in line with Compaq's SG&A expense ratio of 12% of revenues.

Compaq used the acquisition to move into enterprise services and compete with IBM, and by 2001 services made up over 20% of Compaq's revenues, largely due to the DEC employees inherited from the merger. DEC's own PC manufacturing was discontinued after the merger closed. As Compaq did not wish to compete with one of its key partner suppliers, the remainder of Digital Semiconductor (the Alpha microprocessor group) was sold to Intel, which placed those employees back in their Hudson (Massachusetts) office, which they had vacated when the site was sold to Intel in 1997.

Compaq struggled as a result of the merger with DEC, and was acquired by Hewlett-Packard in 2002. Compaq, and later HP, continued to sell many of the former DEC products but re-branded with their own logos. For example, HP now sells what were formerly DEC's StorageWorks disk/tape products, as a result of the Compaq acquisition.

The Digital logo was used up until 2004, even after the company ceased to exist, as the logo of Digital GlobalSoft, an IT services company in India (which was a 51% subsidiary of Compaq). Digital GlobalSoft was later renamed "HP GlobalSoft" (also known as the "HP Global Delivery India Center" or HP GDIC), and no longer uses the Digital logo.

Compaq transferred the DEC company archives to the Computer History Museum in 2004.

== Research and people ==
DEC's Research Laboratories (or Research Labs, as they were commonly known) conducted DEC's corporate research. Some of them were continued in operation by Compaq and are still operated by Hewlett-Packard. The laboratories were:

- Cambridge Research Laboratory (CRL) in Cambridge, Massachusetts, US
- MetroWest Technology Campus (MTC) in Maynard, Massachusetts, US
- Network Systems Laboratory (NSL) in Palo Alto, California, US
- Systems Research Center (SRC) in Palo Alto, California, US
- Paris Research Laboratory (PRL) in Paris, France
- Western Research Laboratory (WRL) in Palo Alto, California, US
- Western Software Laboratory (WSL) in Palo Alto, California, US

Some of the former employees of DEC's Research Labs or DEC's R&D in general include:

- Gordon Bell: technical visionary, VP Engineering 1972–1983; later moved to Microsoft Research
- Luiz André Barroso, pioneered the design of the modern data center
- Leonard Bosack: a co-founder of Cisco Systems
- Mike Burrows: an author of the Burrows–Wheeler transform
- Luca Cardelli: co-designer of the Modula-3 language
- Dave Cutler: led RSX-11M, VAX/VMS, VAXELN and MICA operating systems development; then led Windows NT development at Microsoft
- Ed deCastro: became co-founder of Data General Corporation
- Alan Eustace: co-author of early profiling tools; a Senior Vice President of Engineering at Google; a world-record breaker in the stratosphere jump (2014)
- Jim Gettys: early developer of X Window System
- Henri Gouraud: inventor of the Gouraud shading
- Jim Gray: a Turing Award winner for database research; went missing on a ship trip
- Alan Kotok: chief architect of the PDP-10 series and prolific member of World Wide Web Consortium (W3C)
- Leslie Lamport: a Turing Award recipient; first creator of LaTeX macros;
- Butler Lampson: a contributor to a wide range of personal computing concepts like WYSIWYG text formatting program
- John Leng: computer pioneer, vice president of the large computer group, coined the term "minicomputer"
- Scott A. McGregor: co-author of the X Window System, version 11
- Louis Monier: an Internet and software entrepreneur
- Isaac Nassi: contributor to Ada programming language; co-author of the Nassi–Shneiderman diagram
- Radia Perlman: a pioneer in computer networking standardization; author of Spanning Tree Protocol
- Marcus Ranum: a computer and network security developer credited with a number innovations in firewalls
- Brian Reid: an inventor of Scribe markup language; pioneer in networking and firewalls
- Paul Vixie: a co-author of the BIND DNS server software
- Sanjay Ghemawat
- Jeff Dean
- Patrick O'Neil: a computer scientist well known for his work on databases

Some of the former employees of Digital Equipment Corp were responsible for developing DEC Alpha and StrongARM:

- Daniel W. Dobberpuhl
- Jim Keller
- Rich Witek

Grace Hopper worked for Digital Equipment Corporation as a consultant after her retirement from the United States Navy.

Some of the work of the Research Labs was published in the Digital Technical Journal, which was in published from 1985 until 1998. At least some of the research reports are available online.

== Legacy and accomplishments ==
As of 2012, decades-old hardware (including PDP-11, VAX, and AlphaServer) is being emulated to allow legacy software to run on modern hardware; funding for this is planned to last at least until 2030.

DEC supported the ANSI standards, especially the ASCII character set, which survives in Unicode and the ISO 8859 character set family. DEC's own Multinational Character Set also had a large influence on ISO 8859-1 (Latin-1) and, by extension, Unicode.

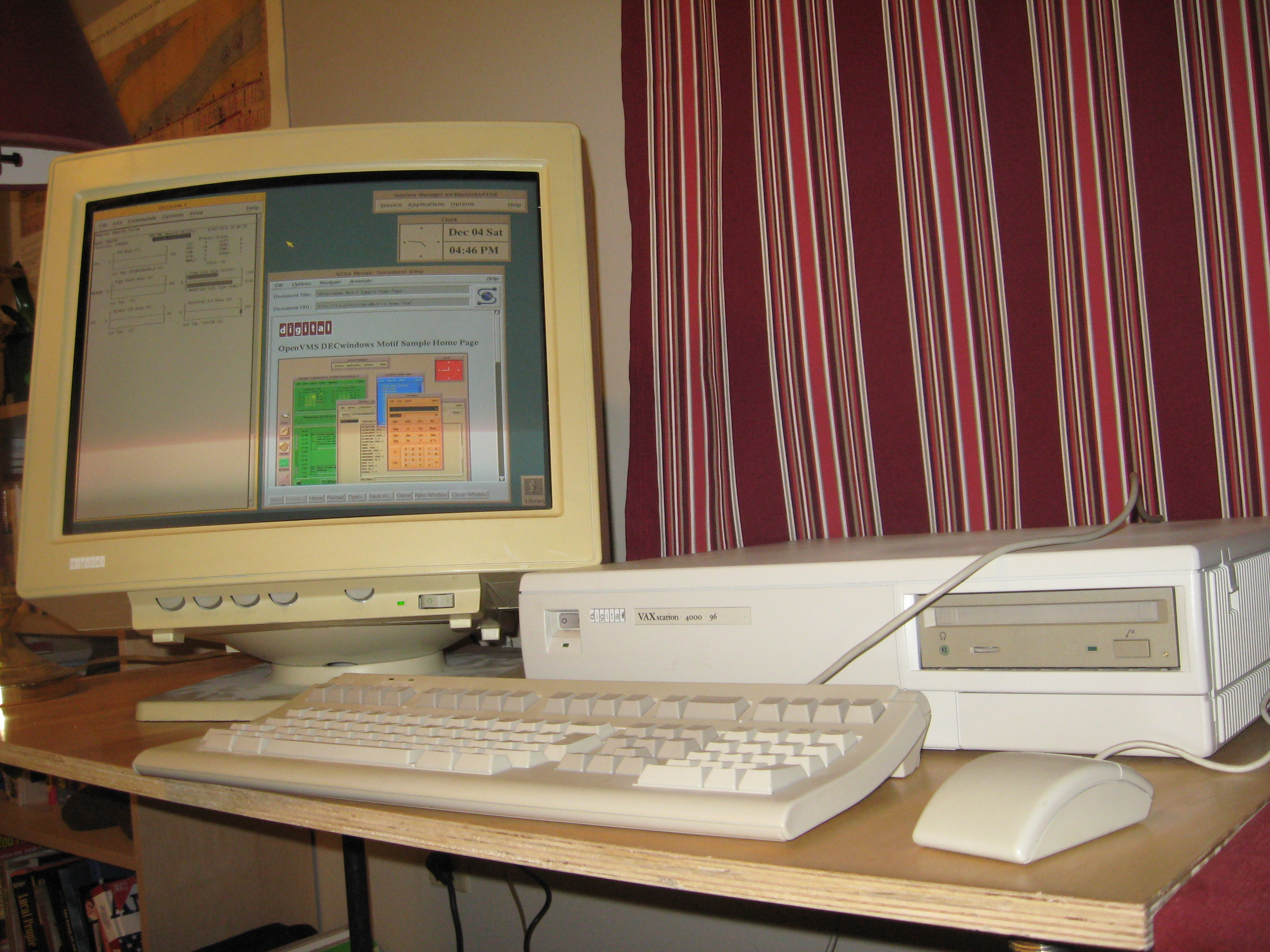
DEC VAXstation

Beyond DECsystem-10/20, PDP, VAX and Alpha, DEC was known for its work in communication subsystem designs, such as Ethernet, DNA (DIGITAL Network Architecture: predominantly DECnet products), DSA (Digital Storage Architecture: disks/tapes/controllers), and its "dumb terminal" subsystems including VT100 and DECserver products.

=== Software ===
Logo of Digital Equipment Corporation's Software division
- The first versions of the C language and the Unix operating system ran on DEC's PDP series of computers (first on a PDP-7, then the PDP-11), which were among the first commercially viable minicomputers, although for several years DEC itself did not encourage the use of Unix.
- DEC produced widely used and influential interactive operating systems, including OS-8, TOPS-10, TOPS-20, RSTS/E, RSX-11, RT-11, and OpenVMS. PDP computers, in particular the PDP-11 model, inspired a generation of programmers and software developers. Some PDP-11 systems more than 25 years old (software and hardware) are still being used to control and monitor factories, transportation systems and nuclear plants. DEC was an early champion of time-sharing systems.
- The command-line interfaces found in DEC's systems, eventually codified as DCL, would look familiar to any user of modern microcomputer CLIs; those used in earlier systems, such as CTSS, IBM's JCL, or Univac's time-sharing systems, would look utterly alien. Many features of the CP/M and MS-DOS CLI show a recognizable family resemblance to DEC's OSes, including command names such as DIR and HELP and the "name-dot-extension" file naming conventions.
- Notes-11 and its follow-on product, VAX Notes, were two of the first examples of online collaboration software, a category that has become to be known as groupware. Len Kawell, one of the original Notes-11 developers, later joined Lotus Development Corporation and contributed to their Lotus Notes product (later HCL Notes).
- The MUMPS programming language, with its built-in database, was developed on the PDP-7, 9, and 15 series machines. MUMPS is still widely used in medical information systems, such as those provide by Meditech and Epic Systems.
- The Babel Fish machine translation service was developed by DEC researchers, and was one of the first machine translators to achieve broad success using natural language processing techniques.
- ALL-IN-1 was an office automation system developed by Skip Walter and others in Central Engineering under Gordon Bell. They developed a customizable list of application invocations and the robust DECMail product that provided one of the first commercially available electronic mail systems.

=== Hardware ===
==== DECtape ====
One of the most unusual peripherals produced for the PDP-10 was the DECtape. The DECtape was a length of special 3/4-inch wide magnetic tape wound on 5-inch reels. The recording format was a highly reliable redundant 10-track design using fixed-length numbered data "blocks" organized into a standard file structure, including a directory. Files could be written, read, changed, and deleted on a DECtape as though it were a disk drive. For greater efficiency, the DECtape drive could read and write to a DECtape in both directions.

In fact, some PDP-10 systems had no disks at all, using DECtapes alone for their primary data storage. The DECtape was also widely used on other PDP models, since it was much easier to use than hand-loading multiple paper tapes. Primitive early time-sharing systems could use DECtapes as system devices and swapping devices. Although superior to paper tape, DECtapes were relatively slow, and were supplanted once reliable disk drives became affordable.

==== Magnetic disk storage ====
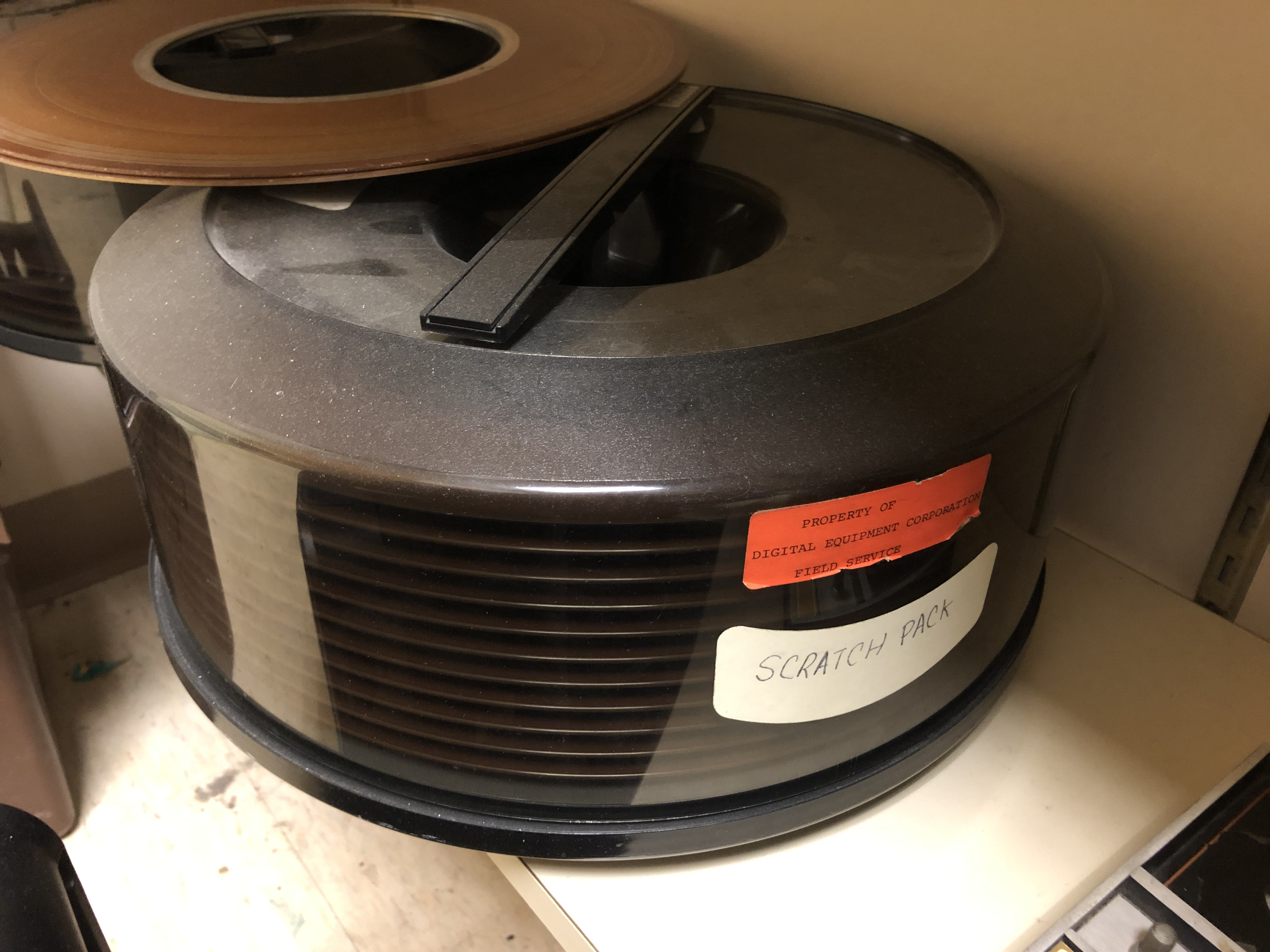
DEC disk platters

DEC was both a manufacturer and a buyer of magnetic disk storage, offering more than 100 different models of hard disk drive (HDD) and floppy disk drive (FDD) during its existence. In the 1970s, it was the single largest OEM purchaser of HDDs, procuring from Diablo, Control Data Corporation, Information Storage Systems, and Memorex, among others.

DEC's first internally developed HDD was the RS08, a 256 kWord fixed-head contact-start-stop drive using plated media; it shipped in 1969.

Beginning in the 1970s, DEC moved first its HDD manufacturing and then its mass storage development labs to Colorado Springs.

DEC pioneered a number of HDD technologies, including sampled data servos (RL01, 1977) and serial HDD interfaces (Standard Disk Interconnect, 1983). The last internally developed disk drive family (RA9x series) used plated media, departing from the HDD industry trend to carbon overcoated sputtered media. DEC designated a $400 million investment to bring this product line into production. The RA92 (1.5 GB) was introduced in 1992, using a 14-inch platter.

DEC purchased its FDDs from OEMs such as Shugart Associates, Toshiba, and Sony.

==== RX50 ====
The way the 400 KB DEC standard (Note: vs. 360KB IBM-compatible/industry standard) RX50 floppy disk drive supported DEC's initial offerings seemed to encapsulate their approach to the personal computer market. Although the mechanical drive hardware was nearly identical to other 5 1/4" floppy disk drives available on competing systems, DEC sought to differentiate their product by using a proprietary disk format for the data written on the disk. The DEC format had a higher capacity for data, but the RX50 drives were incompatible with other PC floppy drives. This required DEC owners to buy higher-priced, specially formatted floppy media, which was harder to obtain through standard distribution channels. DEC attempted to enforce exclusive control over its floppy media sales by copyrighting its proprietary disk format, and requiring a negotiated license agreement and royalty payments from anybody selling compatible media. The proprietary data format meant that RX50 floppies were not interchangeable with other PC floppies, further isolating DEC products from the developing de facto standard PC market. Hardware hackers and DEC enthusiasts eventually reverse-engineered the RX50 format, but the damage had already been done, in terms of market confusion and isolation.

==== Video and Interactive Information Server ====
The video-on-demand project at DEC started in 1992, following Ken Olsen's retirement. At the time the company was rapidly downsizing under Robert Palmer, and it was difficult to gain funding for any new project. DEC's Interactive Video Information Server architecture gained traction and excelled over those of other companies, in that it was highly scalable, using a gateway to set up interactive video delivery sessions on large numbers of video and information servers. Initially high-end VAXes were used, then Alphas.

In 1993 the DEC video-on-demand design team developed a system with a session gateway between the users and a large number of servers. The system was successful in winning video-on-demand trials at US West and other companies. Shortly after the first patent was filed, the session gateway and session gateway and server concept was released to the public domain and proposed in the early Digital Audio Visual Council and MPEG-2 international standards deliberations, with approximately 50 companies attending. The architecture was accepted and voted into the final standards.

In 1993 the design team further developed a media client buffer design that used receive-side buffering for media streaming with read and write pointers. This enabled VCR-like features pause, fast forward, and rewind to be performed at the user's device, e.g. cellphone or laptop, even before the full video was downloaded. This enabled more servers to be allocated to the system, as these features did not always have to be performed at the servers.

In 1995 the system, renamed the "Video and Interactive Information Server", was upgraded with the capability of providing exponentially more video and information access using a hierarchy of session gateways, session gateway proxies, and servers.

With this 1995 Video and Interactive Information Server design, 333,000 streams were provided by US West to set-top box users, and was used by Adlink to distribute advertising to over two million subscribers. The DEC video-on-demand patents portfolio has been cited over 350 times. A Google search in 2025 asking performance improvement of computers from 1995 (the date of this invention) to 2025 yielded 100-1000x performance increase, depending on the usage. Assuming the conservative value of 100x performance, the DEC Video and Interactive Information Server would be able to supply 33 million streams in 2025.

The scalability feature allowed it to win contracts for many of the trials in the 1993-97 timeframe, since the system could theoretically accommodate an extremely large amount of video streams and other non-video content.

The design was proposed and incorporated into the MPEG-2 international standard (finalized in 1995). Its object-oriented interface became the mandatory user-to user core interface in DSM-CC, widely used in video stream and file delivery for MPEG-2 compliant systems, and was carried forward to MPEG-3 compliant systems.

==== Other ====
- VAX and MicroVAX computers (very widespread in the 1980s) running VAX/VMS formed one of the most important proprietary networks, DECnet, which linked business and research facilities. The DECnet protocols formed one of the first peer-to-peer networking standards, with DECnet phase I being released in the mid-1970s. Email, file sharing, and distributed collaborative projects existed within the company long before their value was recognized in the market.
- The LA36 and LA120 dot matrix printers became industry standards and may have hastened the demise of the Teletype Corporation.
- The VT100 computer terminal became the industry standard, implementing a useful subset of the ANSI X3.64 standard, and even today terminal emulators such as HyperTerminal, PuTTY and Xterm still emulate a VT100 (or its more capable successor, the VT220).
- DEC invented Digital Linear Tape (DLT), formerly known as CompacTape, which began as a compact backup medium for MicroVAX systems, and later grew to capacities of 800 gigabytes.
- Work on the first hard-disk-based MP3 player, the Personal Jukebox, started at the DEC Systems Research Center. (The project was started about a month before the merger into Compaq was completed.)
- DEC's Western Research Lab created the Itsy Pocket Computer. This was developed into the Compaq iPaq line of PDAs, which replaced the Compaq Aero PDA.
- DEC also produced a proprietary personal computer known as the Rainbow 100. It could run either MS-DOS or CP/M but from a hardware standpoint it was largely incompatible with the IBM PC.

=== Networking ===
- DEC, Intel and Xerox, through their collaboration to create the DIX standard, were champions of Ethernet, but DEC is the company that made Ethernet commercially successful. Initially, Ethernet-based DECnet and LAT protocols interconnected VAXes with DECserver terminal servers. Starting with the Unibus to Ethernet adapter, multiple generations of Ethernet hardware from DEC were the de facto standard. The CI "computer interconnect" adapter was the industry's first network interface controller to use separate transmit and receive "rings".
- DEC also invented clustering, an operating system technology that treated multiple machines as one logical entity. Clustering permitted sharing of pooled disk and tape storage via the HSC50/70/90 and later series of Hierarchical Storage Controllers (HSC). The HSCs delivered the first hardware RAID 0 and RAID 1 capabilities and the first serial interconnects of multiple storage technologies. This technology was the forerunner to architectures such as Network of Workstations, which are used for massively cooperative tasks such as web searches and drug research.
- The X Window System is the network transparent window system used on Unix and Linux and available on other operating systems such as MacOS. It was developed at MIT jointly between Project Athena and the Laboratory for Computer Science. DEC was the primary sponsor for the project, which was a contemporary of the GNU Project but not associated with it.
- In the period 1994–99 Linus Torvalds developed versions of Linux on early AlphaServer systems provided by the engineering department. Compaq software engineers developed special Linux kernel modules. A well-known Linux distribution that ran on AlphaServer systems was Red Hat 7.2. Another distribution that ran on Alpha was Gentoo Linux.
- DEC was one of the first businesses connected to the Internet, with dec.com, registered in 1985, being one of the first of the now ubiquitous .com domains. DEC's gatekeeper.dec.com was a well-known software repository during the pre-World Wide Web days, and DEC was also the first computer vendor to open a public website, on October 1, 1993.
- DEC once held the Class A IP address block 16.0.0.0/8.

=== AltaVista search engine ===
Although Lycos predated it, DEC researchers created AltaVista, the first comprehensive Internet search engine.

=== Corporate ===
- Digital Federal Credit Union (DCU) is a credit union which was chartered in 1979 for employees of DEC. Today its field of membership is open to existing family members, over 900 different sponsors, several communities in Massachusetts and several organizations. Many of the sponsors are companies that had acquired pieces of DEC.
- Matrix management

== User organizations ==
DECUS – Logo Digital Equipment Corporation Users Society

Originally the users' group was called DECUS (Digital Equipment Computer User Society) during the 1960s to 1990s. When Compaq acquired DEC in 1998, the users group was renamed CUO, the Compaq Users' Organisation. When HP acquired Compaq in 2002, CUO became HP-Interex, although there are still DECUS groups in several countries. In the United States, the organization is represented by the Encompass organization; currently Connect.

== Financial history ==
Table of early sales growth
Year	Net sales	Notes
1962	$6,535,502	
1963	$9,906,968	+51.6%
1964	$10,909,565	
1965	$14,982,920	+37.3%
1966	$22,776,434	+209% of 1964
1967	$38,895,782	+260% of 1965

Year	#Employees (Note: at year-end)	Net sales	Notes
1968	2,600	$57,339,400	+47.4% (in Net sales)
1969	4,360	$87,867,000	+53.2% (compared to prior year)
1970	5,800	$135,408,000	+54.1%
1971	6,200	$146,849,000	
1972	7,800	$166,262,000	

== Works cited ==
- (Present), "Digital Equipment Corporation: Nineteen Fifty-Seven to the Present", DEC Press, 1978
- David Donald Miller (1997). OpenVMS Operating System Concepts. Elsevier. ISBN 978-1-55558-157-2.
- Alan R. Earls (June 30, 2004). Digital Equipment Corporation. Arcadia Publishing. ISBN 978-0-7385-3587-6.
- Edgar H. Schein; with P. DeLisi; P. Kampas; M. Sonduck (July 1, 2003). DEC is dead, long live DEC. Berrett-Koehler Pub. ISBN 978-1-57675-225-8.
- Jamie Parker Pearson, ed. (September 1992). Digital at work: snapshots from the first thirty-five years (PDF). Digital Press. ISBN 1-55558-092-0.
- Glenn & George Harrar Rifkin; George Harrar (1988). The Ultimate Entrepreneur: The Story of Ken Olsen and Digital Equipment Corporation. McGraw-Hill/Contemporary. ISBN 978-0-8092-4559-8.
- C. Gordon Bell; J. Craig Mudge; John E. McNamara; Digital Equipment Corporation (1978). Computer engineering: A DEC view of hardware systems design. Digital Press. ISBN 0-932376-00-2. PDF version also available.
