= Fosi (disambiguation) =

Fosi is a Germanic tribe.

Fosi or FOSI may also refer to:

== People ==
- Polataivao Fosi Schmidt (1933–2005), boxer and Minister of Labor for Samoa
- Fosi Pala'amo (born 1976), New Zealand professional rugby player of Samoan descent

== Other uses ==
- Formatting Output Specification Instance, a stylesheet language for SGML and XML
- Family Online Safety Institute, an international nonprofit organization
- Friends of Stradbroke Island an environmental lobby group on North Stradbroke Island in Queensland, Australia
