= SM4 =

SM4, Sm4 or SM-4 may refer to:

== Technology and engineering ==
- SM4 (cipher), a block cipher used in the Chinese National Standard
- SM-4, minicomputer
- VR Class Sm4, a type of train operated by the VR Group
- HST-SM4, the final servicing mission to the Hubble Space Telescope
- Standard Missile 4, a missile

== Other uses ==
- SM4 (classification), a swimming classification
- SM4, a part of the SM postcode area, in Sutton, England
