= MNOS =

MNOS may refer to:

- Metal–nitride–oxide–semiconductor transistor (MNOS transistor), a semiconductor technology
- MobilNaya Operatsionnaya Sistema, a Unix-like operating system developed in the Soviet Union
