= MOS (operating system) =

Mobile Operating System (MOS)
- OS family: Unix-like
- Working state: Historic
- Source model: Closed source
- Final release: M OS-12
- Available in: Russian
- Supported platforms: SM EVM, ES EVM, Elbrus, PDP-11 clones
- Kernel type: Monolithic
- License: Proprietary

Mobile Operating System (MOS; Russian: Моби́льная Операцио́нная Систе́ма (МОС)) is an operating system, a Soviet clone of Unix from the 1980s.

== Overview ==
This operating system is commonly found on SM EVM minicomputers; it was also ported to ES EVM and Elbrus. MOS is also used by high-end PDP-11 clones.

Modifications of MOS include MNOS, DEMOS, INMOS, etc.

== See also ==
- List of Soviet computer systems
