= PDP-11/73 =

The PDP-11/73 (strictly speaking, the MicroPDP-11/73) was the third generation of the PDP-11 series of 16-bit minicomputers produced by Digital Equipment Corporation to use LSI processors. Introduced in 1983, this system used the DEC J-11 chip set and the Q-Bus, with a clock speed of 15.2 MHz.

The 11/73 (also known as the KDJ11A) is a dual height module with on board bootstrap, cache and bus interface. From a speed perspective it suffered from accessing memory over the Q-bus rather than the private memory interconnect bus adopted by the later PDP-11/83.
