= SM-1420 =

The SM-1420 (CM-1420) is a 16 bit DEC PDP-11/45 minicomputer clone, and the successor to SM-4 in Soviet Bloc countries. Under the direction of Minpribor it was produced in the Soviet Union and Bulgaria from 1983 onwards, and is more than twice as fast as its predecessor. Its closest western counterpart is the DEC PDP-11/45, which means that the Soviet technology trailed 11 years behind compared to the Digital Equipment Corporation equivalent machine.

The standard package includes 256 KiB MOS memory, two RK-06 disks, two TU-10 decks, CM-6315 barrel or DZM-180 dot-matrix printer from Mera Blonie (Poland), VT52 compatible or VTA-2000-15 (BTA 2000-15) VT100 compatible terminals from Mera Elzab.

== See also ==
- History of computing in the Soviet Union
- List of Soviet computer systems
- SM EVM
