= SM EVM =

SM EVM (СМ ЭВМ, abbreviation of Система Малых ЭВМ—literally System of Mini Computers) are several types of Soviet and Comecon minicomputers produced from 1975 through the 1980s.

Most types of SM EVM are clones of DEC PDP-11 and VAX. SM-1 and SM-2 are clones of Hewlett-Packard minicomputers.

The common operating systems for the PDP-11 clones are translated versions of RSX-11 (ОС РВ) for the higher spec models and RT-11 (РАФОС, ФОДОС) for lower spec models. Also available for the high-end PDP-11 clones is MOS, a clone of UNIX.

== See also ==
- SM-4
- SM-1420
- SM-1600
- SM-1710
- SM-1720
