= DEC J-11 =

Microprocessor

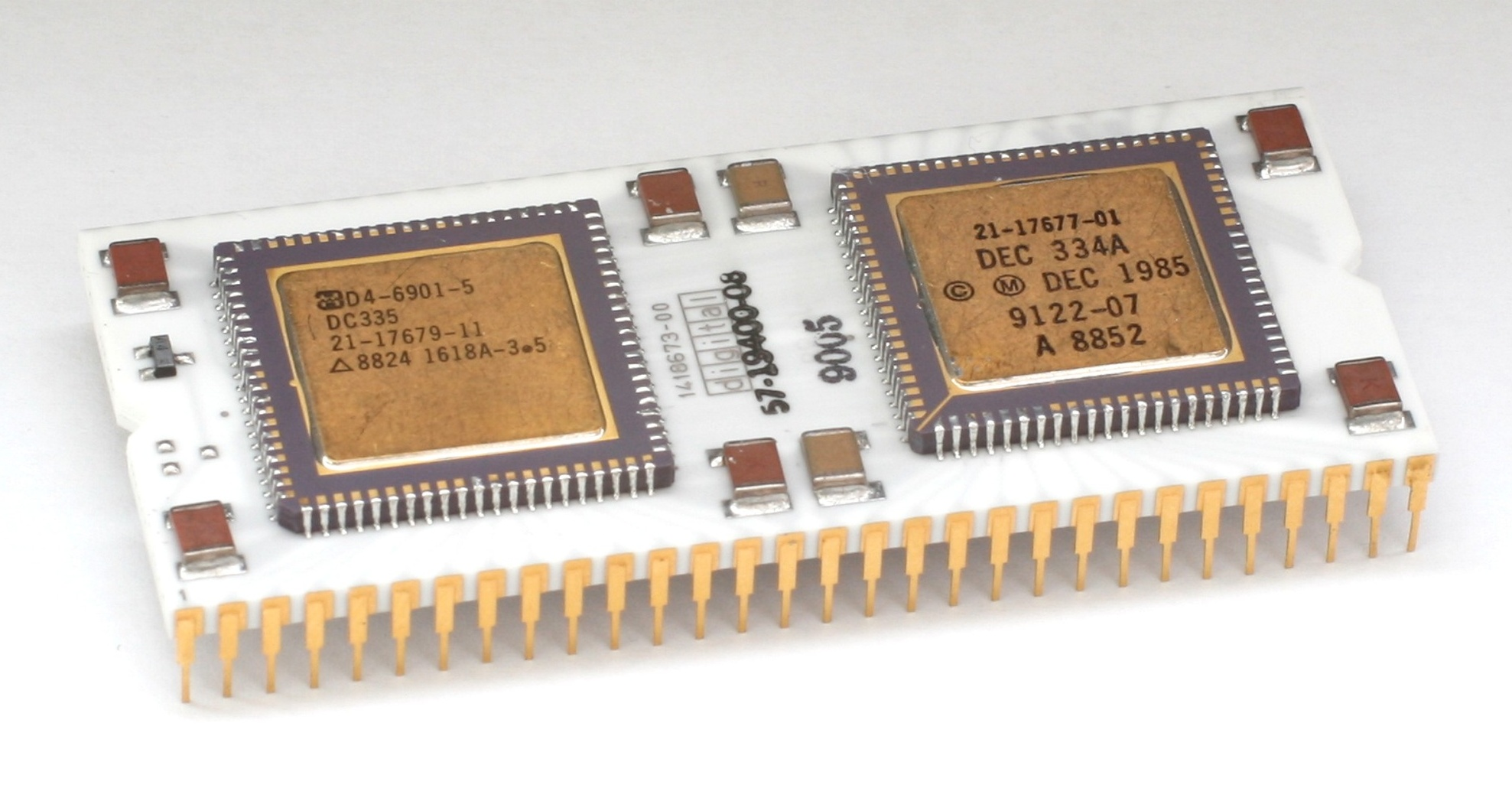
DEC J-11 microprocessor

The J-11 is a microprocessor chip set that implements the PDP-11 instruction set architecture (ISA) jointly developed by Digital Equipment Corporation and Intersil. It was a high-end chip set designed to integrate the performance and features of the PDP-11/70 onto a handful of chips. It was used in the PDP-11/73, PDP-11/83 and Professional 380.

It consisted of a data path chip and a control chip in ceramic leadless packages mounted on a single ceramic hybrid dual inline package (DIP). The control chip incorporated a control sequencer and a microcode ROM. An optional separate floating-point accelerator (FPA) chip could be used, and was packaged in a standard DIP. The data path chip and control chip were fabricated by Intersil in a CMOS process while the FPA was fabricated by Digital in their "ZMOS" NMOS process.

The design originally was intended to support multiple control chips to allow implementation of additional instructions such as the Commercial Instruction Set (CIS), but no such control chips were ever offered.

A clone of the J-11 was manufactured in the Soviet Union under the designation KN1831VM1 (Russian: КН1831ВМ1).

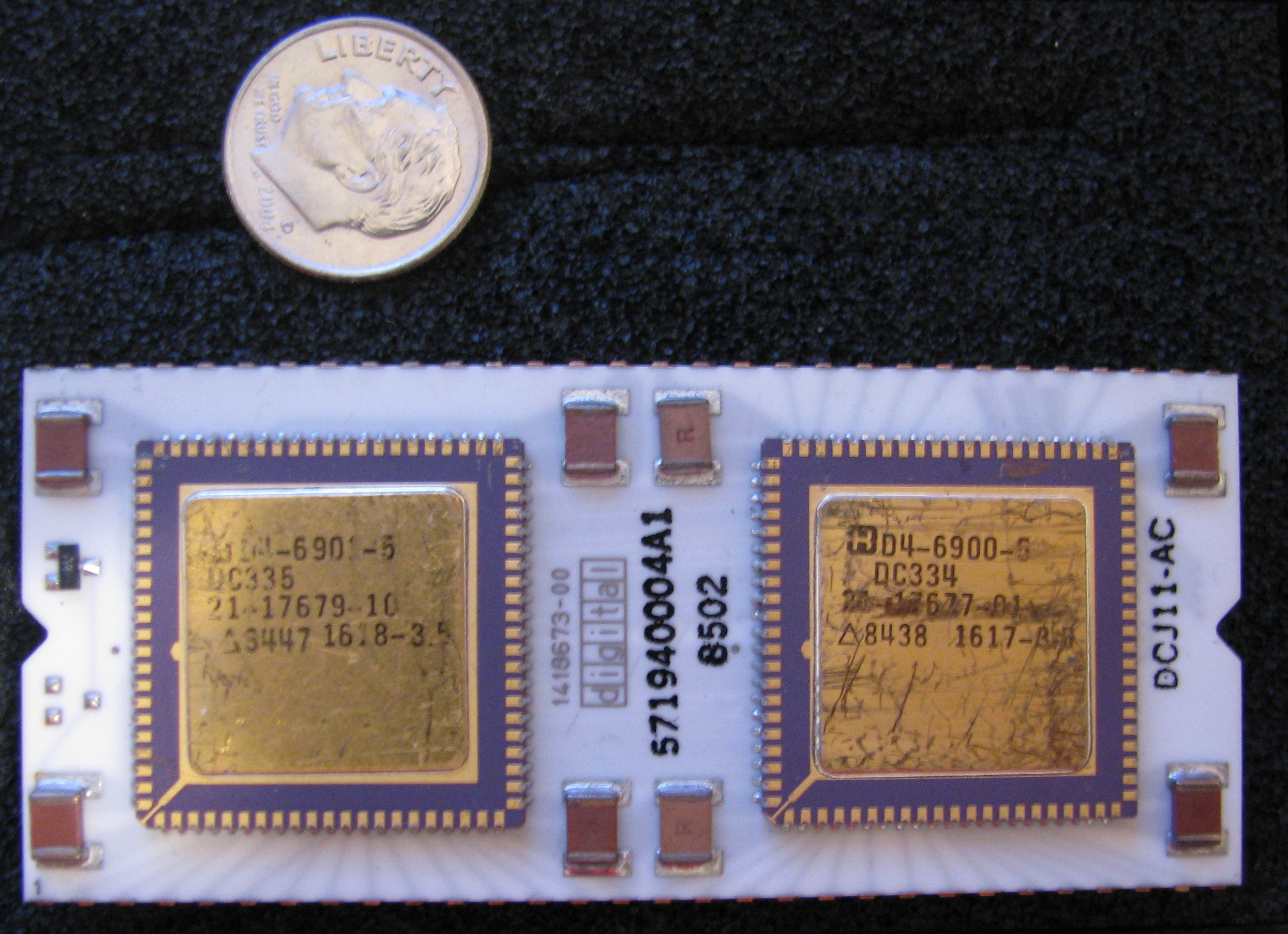
Top side of J-11 microprocessor hybrid. DC335 control chip on left, DC334 data path chip on right. US dime for scale.

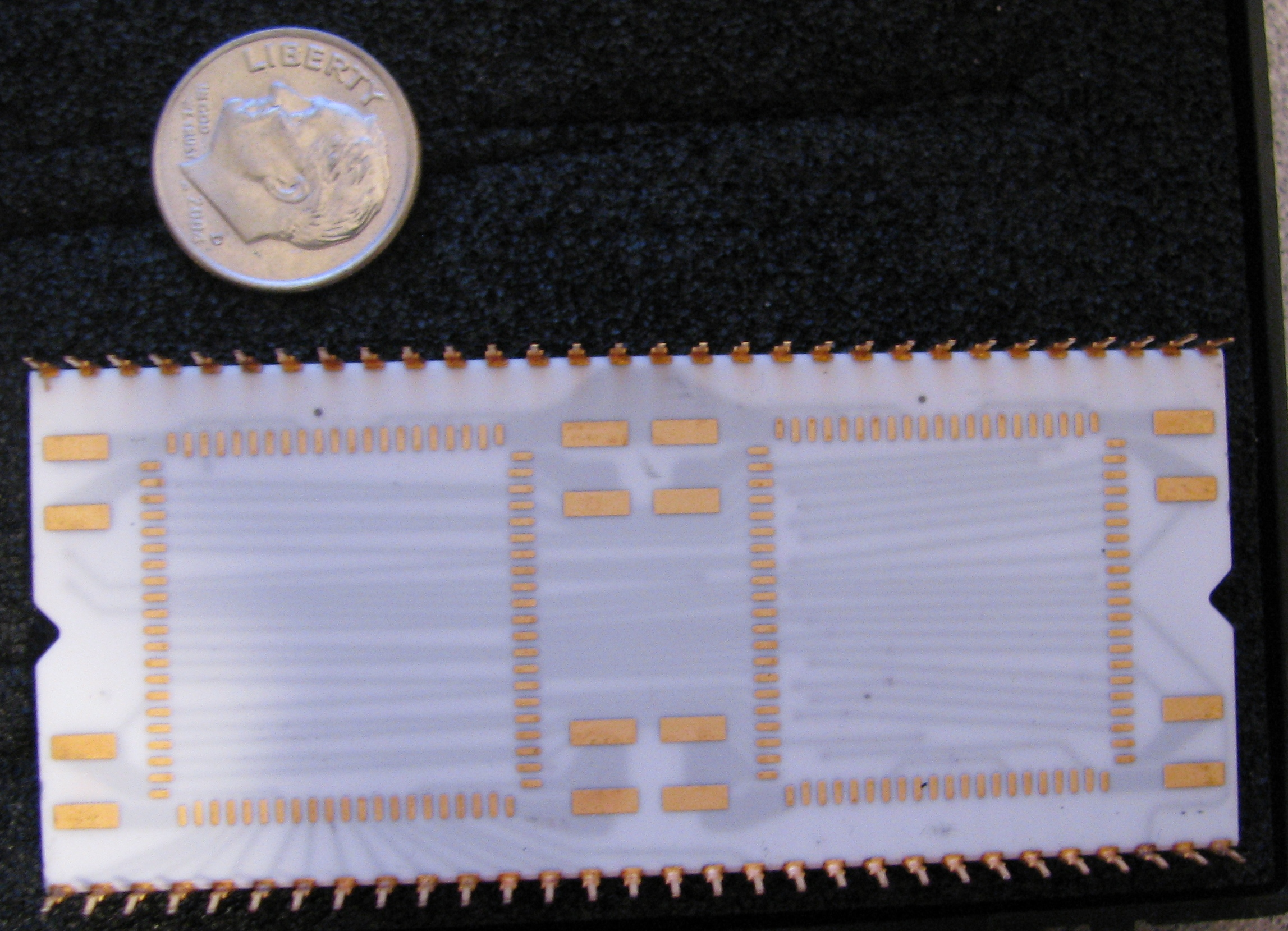
Bottomside of J-11 microprocessor hybrid showing unused mounting positions for two additional control chips.

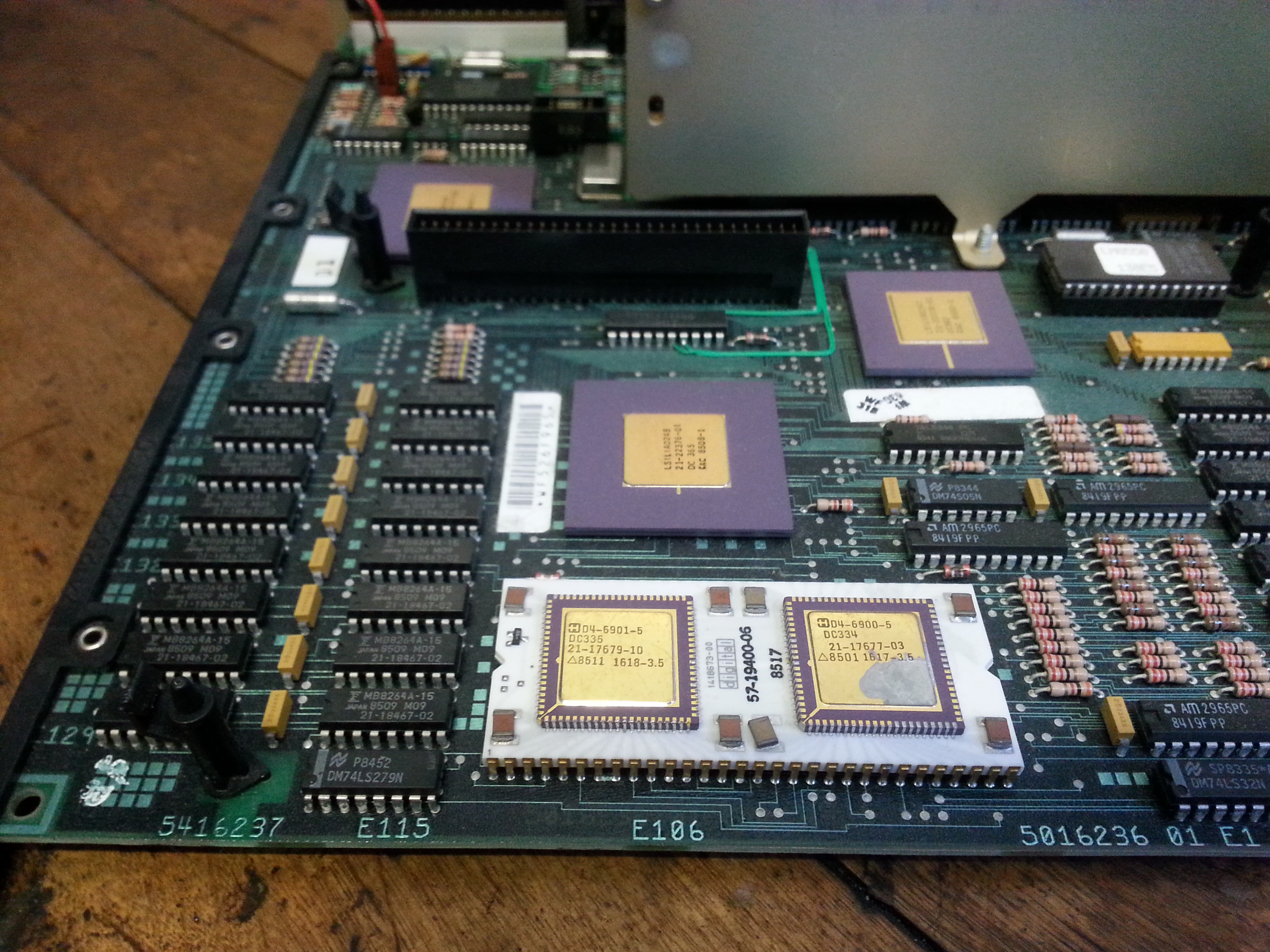
J-11 on the motherboard of a DEC Professional 380.

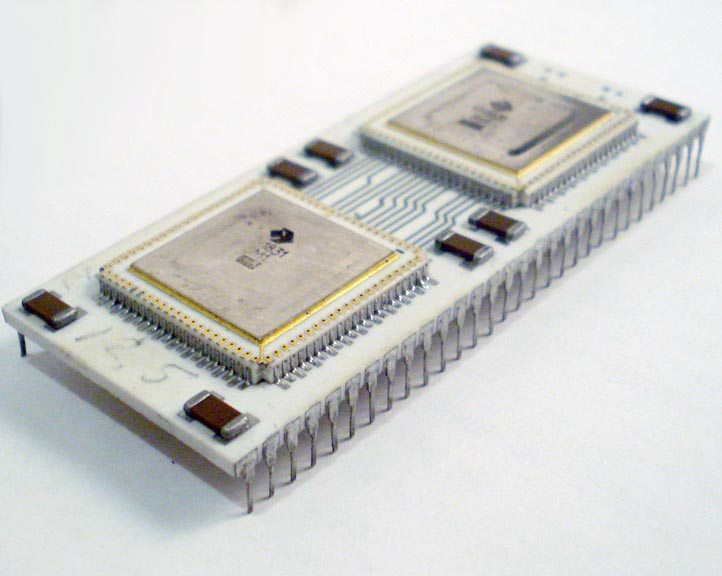
KN1831VM1: Soviet clone of the J-11.

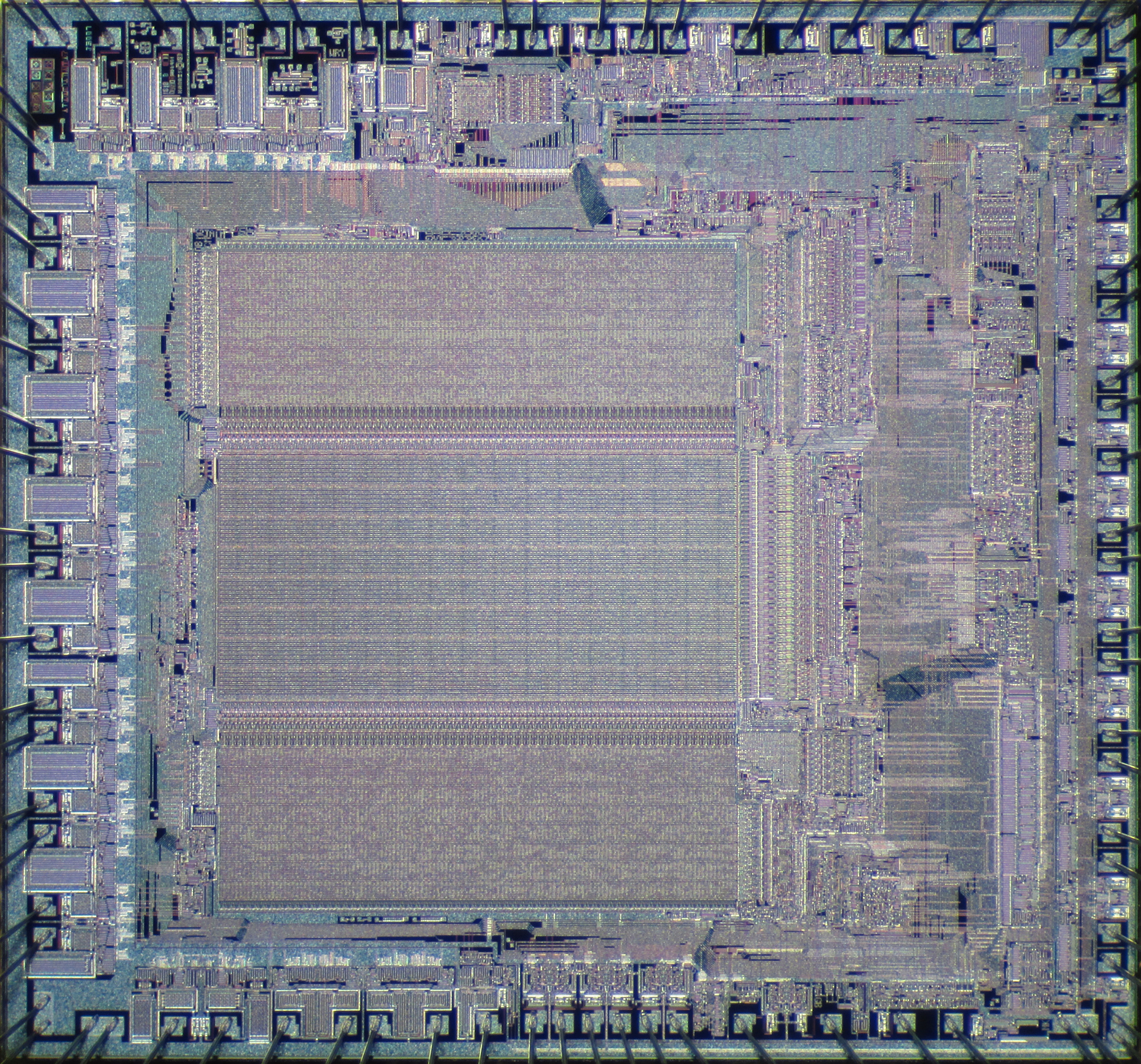
Die shot of DC335 control chip.

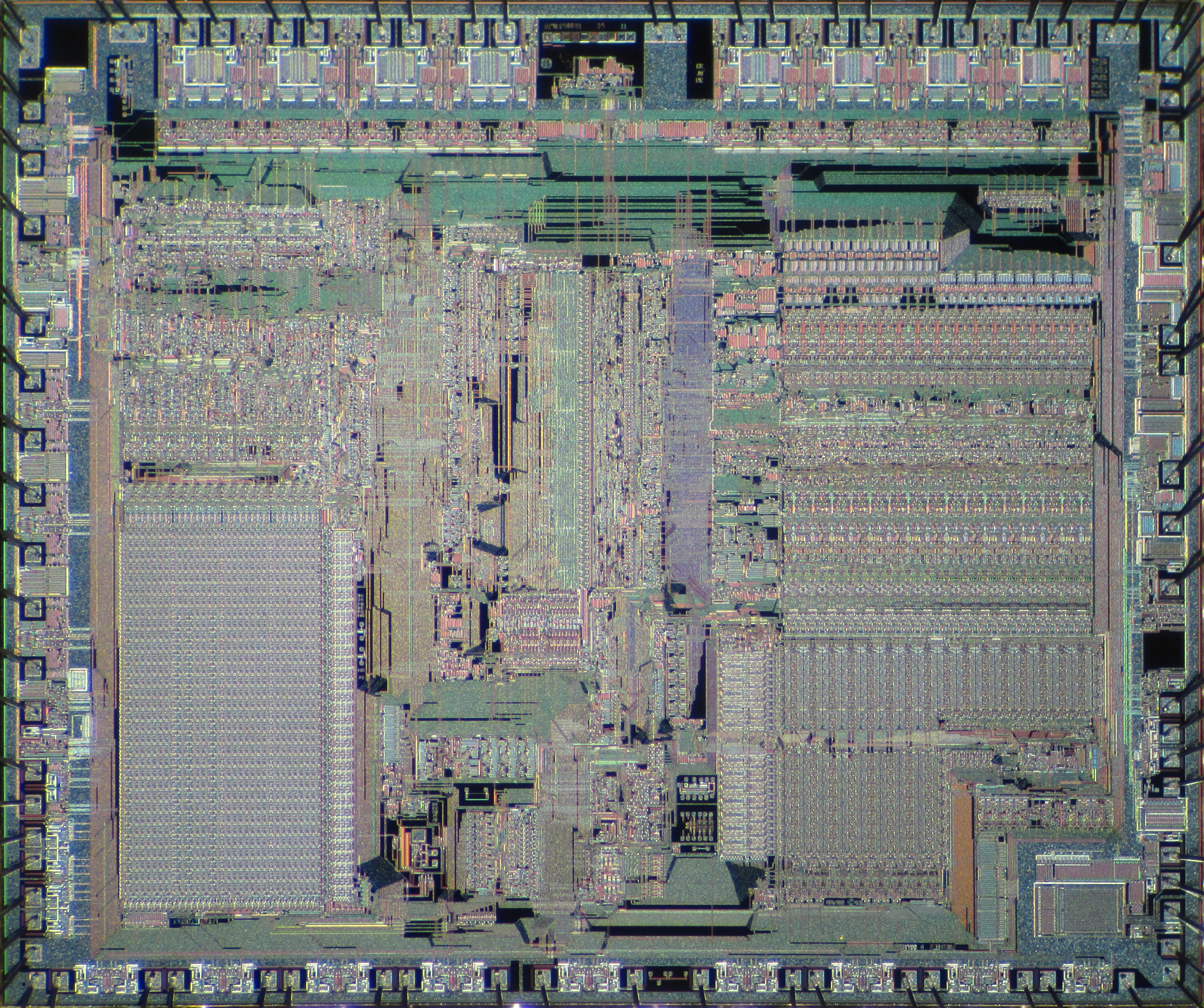
Die shot of DC334 data path chip.

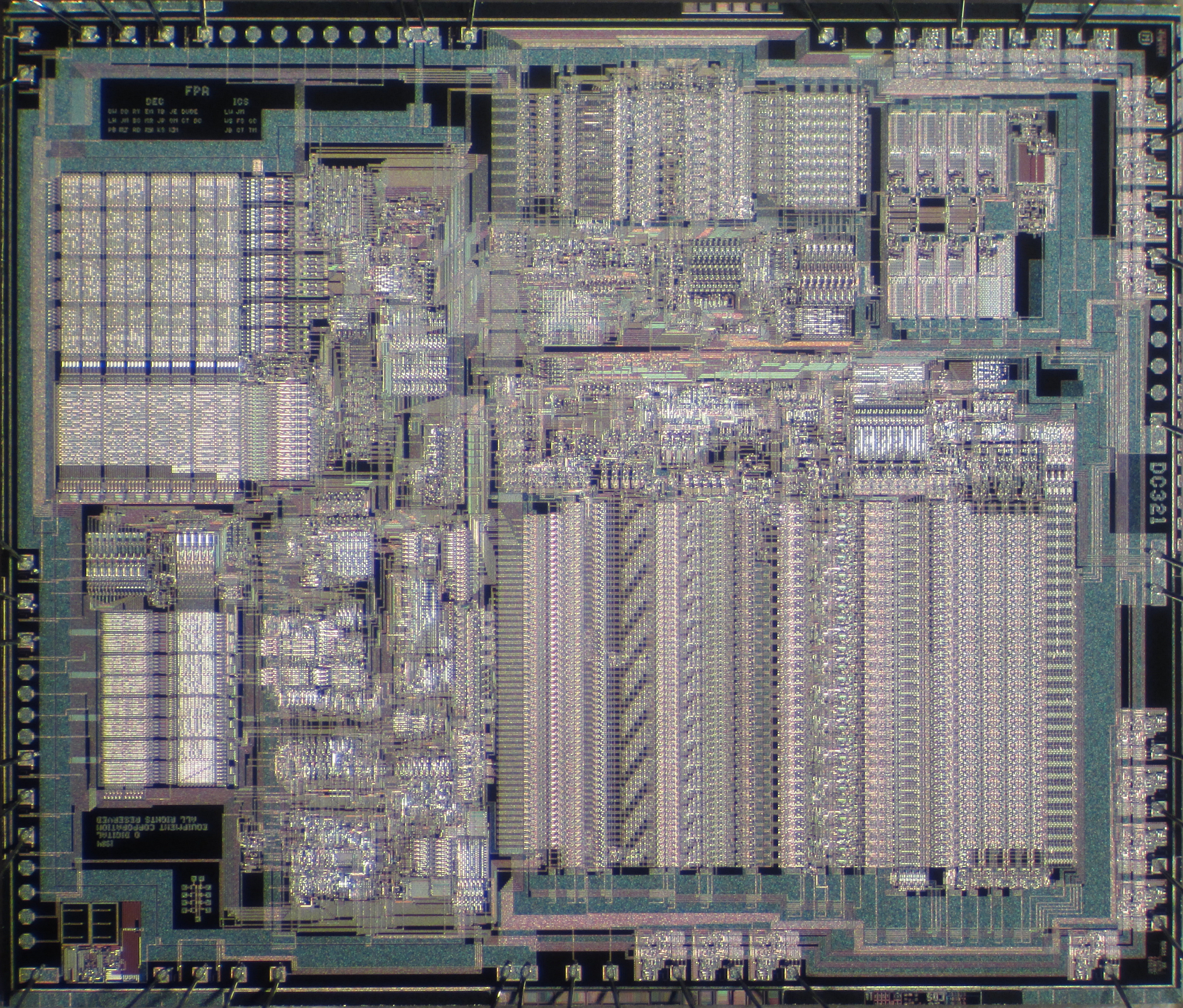
Die shot of DC321 FPA chip.
