= DEMOS =

Unix-like operating system from the Soviet era

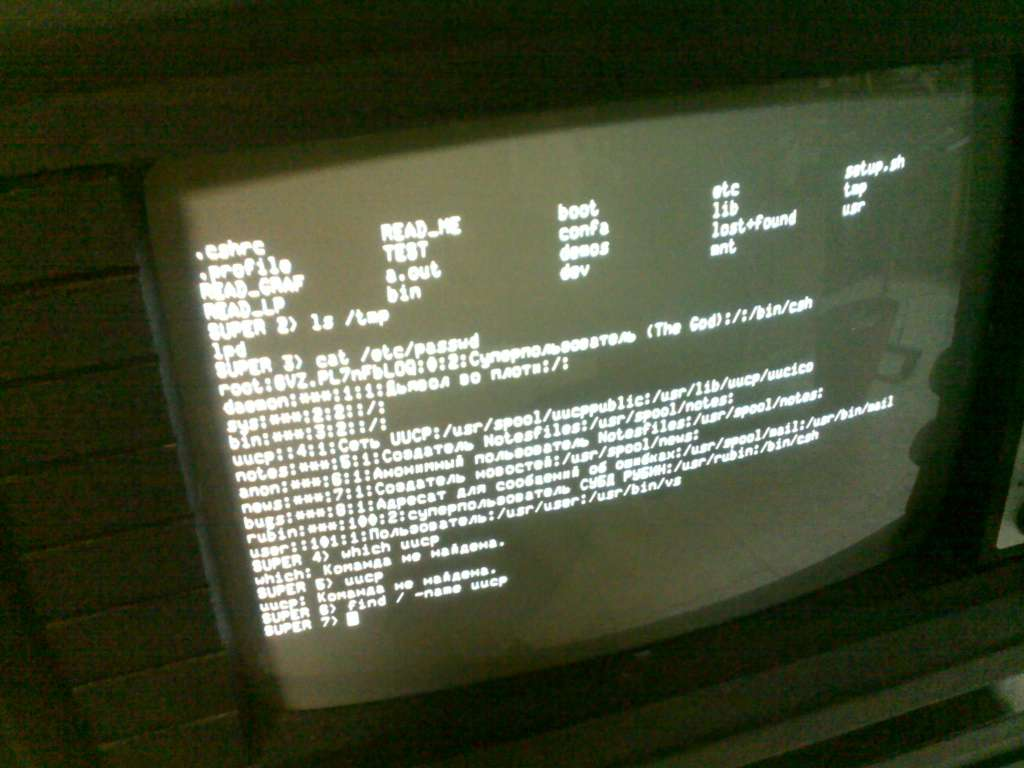
- DEMOS-DVK 3.0, 2011
- Developer: Kurchatov Institute of Atomic Energy, DEMOS Co-operative
- OS family: Unix-like (BSD)
- Working state: Discontinued
- Initial release: 1982; 43 years ago
- Final release: 2.x / 1991; 34 years ago
- Available in: Russian
- Instruction sets: SM-4, Elektronika-1082, Elektronika-85, BESM, ES EVM, VAX-11, PC/XT, Motorola 68020
- Kernel type: Monolithic
- Default user interface: Command-line interface
- Preceded by: MNOS

DEMOS (Dialogovaya Edinaya Mobilnaya Operatsionnaya Sistema: Russian: Диалоговая Единая Мобильная Операционная Система, ДЕМОС, lit. 'Interactive Unified Portable Operating System') is a Unix-like operating system developed in the Soviet Union. It is derived from Berkeley Software Distribution (BSD) Unix.

== Development ==
DEMOS's development was initiated in the Kurchatov Institute of Atomic Energy in Moscow in 1982, and development continued in cooperation from other institutes, and commercialized by DEMOS Co-operative which employed most key contributors to DEMOS and to its earlier alternative, MNOS (a clone of Version 6 Unix). MNOS and DEMOS version 1.x were gradually merged from 1986 until 1990, leaving the joint OS, DEMOS version 2.x, with support for different Cyrillic script character encoding (charsets) (KOI-8 and U-code, used in DEMOS 1 and MNOS, respectively).

Initially it was developed for SM-4 (a PDP-11/40 clone) and SM-1600. Later it was ported to Elektronika-1082, BESM, ES EVM, clones of VAX-11 (SM-1700), and several other platforms, including PC/XT, Elektronika-85 (a clone of DEC Professional), and several Motorola 68020-based microcomputers.

The development of DEMOS effectively ceased in 1991, when the second project of the DEMOS team, RELCOM, took priority.

== See also ==
- MOS (operating system)
