= SM-4 =

The SM-4 (CM-4) is a PDP-11/40 compatible system, manufactured in the Eastern Bloc in the 1980s. It was very popular in science and technology. They were manufactured in the Soviet Union, Bulgaria and Hungary, beginning in 1975.

The standard configuration includes 128 or 256 KB core memory, tape puncher, two RK-05 removable 2.5 MB disks and two RK-05F fixed disks, two TU-10 drives and Videoton VDT-340 terminals (VT52 non-compatible). The SM-4 processor operates at 900,000 operations per second.

The SM-series also includes the SM-3. The SM-3 lacks floating point processing, similar to DEC's PDP 11/40 and 11/34 models. In early production, ferrite core memory is used. It operates at 200,000 operations per second in register-to-register operation.

Operating systems commonly used include:

- RT-11 (Rafos after partial translation)
- RSTS/E
- RSX-11
- DSM-11 (DIAMS after partial translations)
- DEMOS and MNOS

The SM-4 was manufactured in seven configurations, numbers SM-1401 through SM-1407.

Similar models include the SM-1420, with semiconductor memory, and the SM-1600, a hybrid of the SM-1420 and the M-6000, a system produced in Minsk.

The main producer of the SM-4 was Minpribor, at a facility in Kyiv, Ukraine, which began production in 1980.

== See also ==
- SM EVM
- List of Soviet computer systems
