= Datalogics =

Computer software company

Datalogics, Inc.
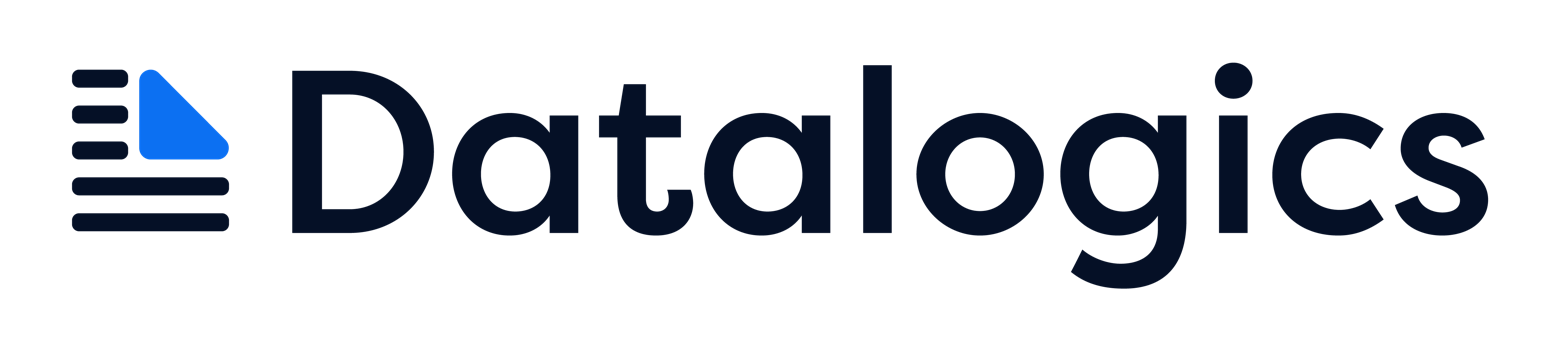
- Type: Private company
- Industry: Computer software
- Founded: Chicago, Illinois, U.S. (1967)
- Founder: Steve Brown
- Headquarters: Chicago, Illinois, United States
- Area served: Worldwide
- Website: www.datalogics.com

Datalogics is a computer software company formed in 1967 and based in Chicago, IL. The company licenses software development kits for working with PDF and other document file types. They have previously developed their own typesetting and database publishing software. Since 1996, Datalogics has also acted as a channel for several SDKs from Adobe Systems. These include the Adobe PDF Library, Adobe Experience Reader Extensions, Adobe Content Server, Adobe InDesign Server, Adobe PDF Converter, Adobe PDF Print Engine and Adobe Reader Mobile SDK. In 2022, Datalogics launched a new business unit called the Cloud Innovation Team, which has since released pdfRest, a REST API toolkit for PDF processing, and pdfAssistant.ai, an AI-powered virtual assistant to perform PDF processing tasks.

== History ==
In 1967, Datalogics was founded as a general programming consulting company, developing one of the first computerized typesetting systems, and building editing workstations and software to drive them. In the 1980s the firm participated in the ISO committee to standardize SGML, the forerunner of XML and HTML, and applied this standard in the release of DL Pager, a high-volume SGML-based batch composition system, along with WriterStation, an SGML text editor. In 1987 the firm participated in the committee to develop the SGML portion of the CALS initiative.

In 1991 DL Composer, a Formatting Output Specification Instance (FOSI)-based batch composition system was released. Shortly after, Datalogics was acquired by Frame Technology and in 1995 Frame Technology (and Datalogics) was acquired by Adobe. In 1996 Adobe Ventures invested in Datalogics, a reincorporation under its original name as a privately held, independent entity.

In 1997 FrameLink, a FrameMaker plugin which connects to a Documentum content management repository was released. Soon following in 1998 DL Formatter, a Variable data printing application was introduced. In 1999 Adobe selected Datalogics to distribute Adobe PDF Library.

In 2004, Datalogics sold DL Formatter business to Printable Technologies Inc., and in 2010, Adobe selected Datalogics to distribute Adobe Reader Mobile SDK. Since then Datalogics has been working with Adobe, acting as a key channel for several of their PDF toolkits as well as developing their own in-house command-line applications for server side software.

== Products ==
Datalogics licenses and supports toolkits for working with PDF and other document type files. These products include the following:

- The Adobe PDF Library, an API for viewing, printing and manipulating PDF files. Built with the same core technology that Adobe uses to build Acrobat, The Adobe PDF Library can merge/split PDFs, extract trapped data, bulk render, add annotations, remove watermarks, convert files into searchable data, create high-volume print jobs and more; add on module Forms Extension is available for developing and supporting static and dynamic AcroForm and XFA within PDFs
- Adobe Content Server, a server product that digitally protects PDF and reflowable EPUB eBooks for mobile devices and Adobe Digital Editions software;
- Adobe Reader Mobile SDK, a collection of APIs for viewing EPUB and PDF eBooks on mobile devices;
- Datalogics PDF Java Toolkit, formerly known as Adobe PDF Java Toolkit, is a Java PDF SDK that provides a broad range of functionality for working with PDF files. Embed the functionality of PDF documents and forms within your own custom applications to automate business workflows;
- PDF Checker, a free Command-Line application for detecting and analyzing common PDF errors. As of 2020, PDF Optimizer is paired with it to streamline and programmatically drive processes based on conditions reported by PDF Checker. Additionally, PDF Optimizer can compress and archive PDFs;
- PDF2IMG converts PDFs to image formats including JPG, PNG, BMP and others;
- PDF2PRINT is a command line application that can be used to print PDFs at scale;
- PDF Forms Flattener is a standalone, command line interface tool. It can flatten XFA and AcroForm documents;
- ACS Cloud Service a cloud storage service to synchronize content, bookmarks and highlights across multiple devices for Adobe Content Server;

=== Legacy Software ===
Datalogics’ old suite of products that is no longer being developed or supported. These products include the following:

- DL Reader, a customizable eReader app for iOS, Android and Windows;
- PDF WebAPI, a RESTful web services API for manipulating PDF files;
- DL Pager, a batch-pagination SGML-based typesetting engine and database publishing application;
- DL Composer, a FOSI-based composition engine
