= Formatting Output Specification Instance =

In computing, FOSI (Formatting Output Specification Instance) is a stylesheet language for SGML and, later, XML. FOSI was developed by the US Department of Defense to control the pagination and layout of SGML and XML technical data. FOSI stylesheets are themselves written in SGML, an approach that would later be adopted by XSL. FOSI was implemented by, among others, Datalogics, Arbortext and X.Systems. FOSI is documented in the book Practical FOSI for Arbortext Editor (©2015) by Suzanne Napoleon.
