= MNOS (operating system) =

- Developer: IPK Minavtoproma, DEMOS Co-operative
- OS family: Version 6 Unix
- Working state: Discontinued
- Initial release: 1983; 42 years ago
- Final release: RL 1.2 / 1986; 39 years ago
- Kernel type: Monolithic

MNOS (MobilNaya Operatsionnaya Sistema, МобильНая Операционная Система (МНОС), or Portable Operating System) is a Unix-like operating system developed in the Soviet Union.

== Overview ==
The system is derived from Version 6 Unix and then modified to incorporate features of Berkeley Software Distribution (BSD) Unix. From 1983 until 1986, it enjoyed popularity in the Soviet Union and other Eastern Bloc countries, due to its small size and faster performance than that of other Version 7 Unix (and later BSD Unix-based) alternatives.

Its development began in the IPK Minavtoproma in Moscow in 1981, and continued in cooperation with other institutes, including Kurchatov Institute. MNOS and its alternative, DEMOS version 1.x, were gradually merged from 1986 until 1990 resulting in the joint OS, DEMOS version 2.x. MNOS became the first fully bilingual version of Unix, and uses a proprietary 8-bit Cyrillic script character set, U-code, which was dropped in favor of KOI-8 in the process of merging with DEMOS.

The origin of the version qualifier RL is Rabochaya Loshadka (The working horsy)

== See also ==
- DEMOS
- MOS (operating system)
