= DEC MICA =

Computer operating system

MICA
- Developer: Digital Equipment Corporation
- Written in: PILLAR, C, SPASM
- Working state: Abandoned
- Source model: Closed-source
- Marketing target: Minicomputers, Workstations
- Available in: English
- Supported platforms: DEC PRISM
- Kernel type: Monolithic kernel
- Userland: VMS and ULTRIX
- Influenced: Windows NT
- Influenced by: VAX/VMS, Ultrix, VAXELN
- Default user interface: DCL, Unix shell, DECwindows
- License: Proprietary

MICA is the codename of the operating system developed for the DEC PRISM architecture. MICA was designed by a team at Digital Equipment Corporation led by Dave Cutler. MICA's design was driven by Digital's need to provide a migration path to PRISM for Digital's VAX/VMS customers, as well as allowing PRISM systems to compete in the increasingly important Unix market. MICA attempted to address these requirements by implementing VMS and ULTRIX user interfaces on top of a common kernel that could support the system calls (or "system services" in VMS parlance), libraries and utilities needed for both environments.

MICA was cancelled in 1988 along with the PRISM architecture, before either project was complete. MICA is most notable for inspiring the design of Windows NT (also designed by Cutler) . When the PRISM architecture evolved into the DEC Alpha architecture, Digital opted to port OSF/1 and VMS to Alpha instead of reusing MICA.

== Design goals ==
To avoid a repetition of PDP-11's many incompatible operating systems, Digital Equipment Corporation (DEC) designed VMS as VAX's single operating system. Nonetheless, customer demands forced DEC to also develop and support Ultrix, its own Unix.

The original goal for MICA was that all applications would have full and interchangeable access to both the VMS and ULTRIX interfaces, and that a user could choose to log in to an ULTRIX or VMS environment, and run any MICA application from either environment. However, it proved to be impossible to provide both full ULTRIX and full VMS compatibility to the same application at the same time, and Digital scrapped this plan in favour of creating a standalone PRISM ULTRIX. PRISM ULTRIX started off as a port of VAX ULTRIX to PRISM, but it was intended that it would be augmented with functionality from MICA over time. Emphasis was placed on allowing the same layered products to be shared between MICA and PRISM ULTRIX. Proposals were made for reinstating Unix compatibility in MICA on a per-application basis so that a MICA application could be compiled and linked against the VMS interfaces, or the ULTRIX interfaces, but not both simultaneously.

Over time, scheduling concerns and changes in priorities dictated that the first PRISM systems would have shipped with restricted subsets of the MICA operating system. This included systems such as Cheyenne and Glacier — a dedicated database server, and distributed computing engine respectively. MICA would not implement user interfaces for these systems, but instead exposed remote procedure call endpoints, and users would interact with the MICA system through client utilities running on a VAX/VMS frontend system.

== Programming ==
MICA was to be written almost entirely in a high-level programming language named PILLAR. PILLAR evolved from EPascal (the VAXELN-specific dialect of Pascal) via an interim language called the Systems Implementation Language (SIL). PILLAR would have been backported to VAX/VMS, allowing applications to be developed that could be compiled for both VAX/VMS and MICA. A common set of high-level runtime libraries named ARUS (Application Runtime Utility Services) would have further facilitated portability between MICA, OSF/1, VAX/VMS and ULTRIX. As part of the PRISM project, a common optimizing compiler backend named GEM was developed (this survived and became the compiler backend for the Alpha and Itanium ports of VMS, as well as Tru64).

In addition to PILLAR, MICA provided first-class support for ANSI C in order to support Unix applications. An assembler named SPASM (Simplified PRISM Assembler) was intended for the small amount of assembly code needed for the operating system, and would not have been made generally available in order to dissuade customers from developing non-portable software. Similarly, an implementation of BLISS was developed for internal use only, in order to allow pre-existing VAX/VMS applications to be ported to MICA. MICA would have featured ports or rewrites of many VAX/VMS layered products, including Rdb, VAXset, DECwindows, and most of the compilers available for VAX/VMS.

== Legacy ==
When PRISM and MICA were cancelled, Dave Cutler left Digital for Microsoft, where he was put in charge of the development of what became known as Windows NT. Cutler's architecture for NT was heavily inspired by many aspects of MICA. In addition to the implementation of multiple operating system APIs on top of a common kernel (Win32, OS/2 and POSIX in NT's case) MICA and NT shared the separation of the kernel from the executive, the use of an Object Manager as the abstraction for interfacing with operating system data structures, and support for multithreading and symmetric multiprocessing.

After the cancellation of PRISM, Digital began a project to produce a faster VAX implementation which could run VMS and provide comparable performance to its DECstation line of Unix systems. When these attempts failed, the design group concluded that VMS itself could be ported to a PRISM-like architecture. This led to the DEC Alpha architecture, and the Alpha port of VMS.

The PRISM ULTRIX project was followed by a new project at DECwest named OZIX, which was intended to create a high-end alternative to ULTRIX and OSF/1 for the commercial computing market — traditionally dominated by VMS and IBM's mainframe and midrange systems. OZIX was targeted at both MIPS and Alpha hardware, and contained various features to provide superior availability, security and ease of management compared with other Unix variants. OZIX was ultimately canceled, but some features were carried over to OSF/1 — in particular the OZIX filesystem was the basis of DEC's AdvFS filesystem. DEC also investigated the feasibility of hosting OpenVMS on top of the Mach 3 kernel, and created a proof of concept with a subset of VMS' features.

In a 2023 interview, Dave Cutler said of the project: "MICA was wildly ambitious, ... at the level of ambition of Multics. If we had ever built it, probably no one would have ever bought it, but it had a lot of good ideas in it."
