= Language-Sensitive Editor =

Language-Sensitive Editor (LSE) is a full-screen visual editor for the VAX/VMS and OpenVMS Operating systems. LSE is implemented by using the Text Processing Utility (TPU) language. It is part of the DECset programming tool set, which also contains a test manager, the performance and coverage analyzer (PCA), a code management system (CMS), and a module management mystem (MMS).

== Features ==
LSE requires the features of a VT100 terminal and successors, or a compatible terminal emulator. It has the following features:

- Syntax templates for a number of programming languages, which can be modified or extended by the user.
- Windowing support.
- Compilation and debug within editor.
- Programmable editing functions.
- EDT keypad layout default.

== Languages ==
As shipped in 1999 LSE came with templates for the following programming languages:

- DEC Ada
- DEC BASIC
- DEC C
- DEC C++
- VAX COBOL
- DIGITAL Fortran
- DEC PASCAL
- VAX BLISS-32
- VAX C
- VAX MACRO
- DEC PL/I

As of 2007 the following additional templates were supplied:

- Kednos PL/I for OpenVMS
- VAX ADA
- VAX BASIC
- VAX BLISS
- VAX CDD/Plus
- DEC COBOL
- VAX Datatrieve
- DEC DATATRIEVE
- VAX DIBOL
- VAX DOCUMENT
- VAX FORTRAN
- MACRO-64
- VAX SCAN
