= DEC BATCH-11/DOS-11 =

DOS-11
- Developer: Digital Equipment Corporation
- Written in: FOCAL, Fortran-IV, MACRO-11, TECO
- Working state: Discontinued
- Source model: Closed source
- Initial release: 1970; 56 years ago
- Latest release: V09-20C / June 1974; 52 years ago
- Supported platforms: PDP-11
- Default user interface: Command-line interface
- License: Proprietary

BATCH-11/DOS-11, also known simply as DOS-11, is a discontinued operating system by Digital Equipment Corporation (DEC) of Maynard, Massachusetts. The first version of DOS-11 (V08-02) was released in 1970 and was the first operating system to run on the Digital PDP-11 minicomputer. DOS-11 was not known to be easy to use even in its day and became much less used in 1973 with the release of the RT-11 operating system.

== Features ==
DOS-11 included:

- DOS-Monitor
- Edit-11 (text editor)
- FORTRAN IV (programming language)
- Libr-11 (librarian)
- Link-11 (linker)
- ODT-11R (debugging program)
- PAL-11R (assembler)
- PIP (file utility package)

DOS-11 came with XXDP, a diagnostics and monitor program for the PDP-11. Like other Digital operating systems, DOS-11 also had a FORTRAN-IV (Ansi-66) compiler. FORTRAN-IV was not supported on PDP-11 systems with less than 12K of memory. DOS-11 systems running in 8K and 12K configurations ran a limited version of the MACRO-11 Assembler (PAL-11R in overlaid form).

The DOS-11 operating system kernel was one file called MONLIB.LCL. The LCL extension was the acronym for LInked Core Image Library (or LICIL). An LICIL could be stored on any type of media that the DOS-11 operating system was distributed on (disk, DECtape, punched tape or magnetic tape). When the LICIL file was installed (Hooked) onto a disk drive as a contiguous file, the monitor library name is changed to MONLIBCIL which could then be booted. The CIL extension was the acronym for Core Image Library. Core, was the term for the core memory systems common to the PDP-11. A Core Image Library could be created with the CILUS (Core Image Library Update and Save) program. A MONLIBCIL typically contained the resident monitor (RMON), the keyboard command routine, device drivers, EMT routines, the clock routines and the transient monitor.

== Legacy ==
DOS-11 was used to compile and install early versions of the RSTS-11 and RSTS/E operating systems however it is an ancestor to the RSX-11 family of operating systems.
