= DEC Text Processing Utility =

The DEC Text Processing Utility (or DECTPU) is a dedicated programming language developed by Digital Equipment Corporation (DEC) to easily create multi-functional text editors.

TPU is part of OpenVMS. It can be used on a terminal, a console, or on a graphical system like DECwindows.

== Functionality ==
TPU provides text buffer management APIs in concert with window management APIs which are targeted for the VT100 line of terminals. This allowed split-screen windows with scrolling and hence multiple views of the same buffer content. There are also key mapping APIs provided, allowing a wide range of functionality for editing text. The keyboard mapping could be easily adapted by the admin or the user.

Users could write their own specific editor, to e.g. translate text or short (error) messages to multiple natural languages in a synchronised small text window. The text editor is callable, so you could have small text editors built into specific applications, e.g. a simple mail client. You might redirect output from applications into a text window, using inter-process communication. Therefore one could call web services to return their results into a text buffer.

== Implementations ==
- EVE (Extensible Versatile Editor), the first TPU-based editor, delivered with VAX/VMS by mid-1985.
- In 1986, DEC developed a new version of EDT written in TPU
- Language-Sensitive Editor, part of VAXset (software development platform)
- A version of the vi editor was created by Gregg Wonderly at Oklahoma State University called TPUVI or VITPU. VITPU is still available via the DECUS archives online.
