= EDT (Digital) =

EDT is a character-based text editor from Digital Equipment Corporation (DEC) running on PDP-11 (RSX-11, RSTS/E and RT-11), and later for its OpenVMS operating system. It can respond to single keystrokes, and uses function keys to implement commands to the editor. EDT was introduced originally as a line-mode editor. The screen mode was developed first as the Keyboard Editor (KED) on RT-11 as part of the FMS-11 project by Darrell Duffy; EDT on the other operating systems was then enhanced to be compatible with KED.

The editor contains both line mode commands and a screen based editor. In screen mode, the default action for the user is to directly update text as they type, with special commands available by pressing keypad commands. Arrow keys allow for simple navigation, while keypad commands allow for more complex navigation and searches. As with many user interfaces developed around this time, EDT uses the "Gold Key" style of input first developed for the WPS-8 word processing system. "Gold Key" editing uses the PF1 keypad key as a prefix key allowing the introduction of a wide variety of commands using both the keypad keys and keys on the main keyboard. Pressing the PF2 keypad key gives on-screen help on the keypad and other key combinations:

/-----------------------------------\      /-----------------------------------\
|   ^    |  DOWN  |        |        |      |        |        | FNDNXT | DEL L  |
|   |    |   |    | <----  |  ----> |      |  GOLD  |  HELP  |        |        |
|   |    |   |    |  LEFT  |  RIGHT |      |        |        |  FIND  | UND L  |
|   UP   |   v    |        |        |      |--------+--------+--------+--------|
\-----------------------------------/      |  PAGE  |  SECT  | APPEND | DEL W  |
DELETE      Delete character               |        |        |        |        |
LINEFEED    Delete to beginning of word    | COMMAND|  FILL  | REPLACE| UND W  |
BACKSPACE   Backup to beginning of line    |--------+--------+--------+--------|
CTRL/A      Compute tab level              | ADVANCE| BACKUP |  CUT   | DEL C  |
CTRL/D      Decrease tab level             |        |        |        |        |
CTRL/E      Increase tab level             | BOTTOM |  TOP   | PASTE  | UND C  |
CTRL/K      Define key                     |--------+--------+--------+--------|
CTRL/R      Refresh screen                 |  WORD  |  EOL   |  CHAR  |        |
CTRL/T      Adjust tabs                    |        |        |        | ENTER  |
CTRL/U      Delete to beginning of line    |CHNGCASE| DEL EOL| SPECINS|        |
CTRL/W      Refresh screen                 |-----------------+--------|        |
CTRL/Z      Exit to line mode              |      LINE       | SELECT |        |
                                           |                 |        |  SUBS  |
Press a key for help on that key.          |    OPEN LINE    | RESET  |        |
To exit, press the spacebar.               \-----------------------------------/

Users can configure default actions or define key sequences for their editor by placing EDT commands in an initialization file which is executed upon starting the editor.

DEC later developed TPU, a powerful language for designing text editors on its VMS systems. TPU was used to produce a new standard text editor, EVE, as well as to rewrite EDT. EVE included an emulator of the EDT screen mode keypad for the benefit of those who were used to particular key functions. Both EVE and the TPU implementation of EDT are still distributed with OpenVMS.

Text editors based on the EDT user interface have been developed for other systems, including for instance sedt, an EDT-based editor for Unix systems.
