= VAXELN =

Real-time operating system

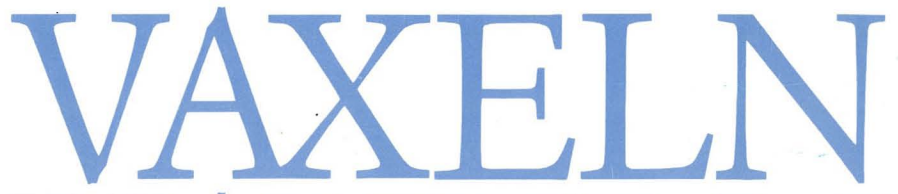
- Developer: Digital Equipment Corporation
- Written in: Pascal
- Working state: Discontinued
- Source model: Closed source
- Initial release: 1982; 44 years ago
- Final release: 4.6 / May 1996; 30 years ago
- Marketing target: Embedded systems, real-time systems
- Available in: English
- Supported platforms: VAX family
- Kernel type: Monolithic
- Default user interface: Command-line interface
- License: Proprietary

VAXELN (typically pronounced "VAX-elan") is a discontinued real-time operating system for the VAX family of computers produced by the Digital Equipment Corporation (DEC) of Maynard, Massachusetts.

As with RSX-11 and VMS, Dave Cutler was the principal force behind the development of this operating system. Cutler's team developed the product after moving to the Seattle, Washington area to form the DECwest Engineering Group; DEC's first engineering group outside New England. Initial target platforms for VAXELN were the backplane interconnect computers such as the V-11 family. When VAXELN was well under way, Cutler spearheaded the next project, the MicroVAX I, the first VAX microcomputer. Although it was a low-volume product compared with the New England-developed MicroVAX II, the MicroVAX I demonstrated the set of architectural decisions needed to support a single-board implementation of the VAX computer family, and it also provided a platform for embedded system applications written for VAXELN.

The VAXELN team made the decision, for the first release, to use the programming language Pascal as its system programming language. The development team built the first product in approximately 18 months. Other languages, including C, Ada, and Fortran were supported in later releases of the system as optional extras. A relational database, named VAX Rdb/ELN was another optional component of the system. Later versions of VAXELN supported an X11 server named EWS (VAXELN Window Server). VAXELN with EWS was used as the operating system for the VT1300 X terminal, and was sometimes used to convert old VAXstation hardware into X terminals. Beginning with version 4.3, VAXELN gained support for TCP/IP networking and a subset of POSIX APIs.

VAXELN allowed the creation of a self-contained embedded system application that would run on VAX (and later MicroVAX) hardware with no other operating system present. The system was debuted in Las Vegas in the early 1980s, with a variety of amusing application software written by the development team, ranging from a system that composed and played minuets to a robotic system that played and solved the Tower of Hanoi puzzle.

VAXELN was not ported to the DEC Alpha architecture, and instead was replaced with a Digital-supported port of VxWorks to Alpha, and a VAXELN application programming interface (API) compatibility layer for that platform. In 1999, SMART Modular Technologies acquired Compaq's (formerly Digital's) embedded systems division, which included VAXELN.

== Origin of name ==
The system was originally supposed to be named Executive for Local Area Network (ELAN), but DEC discovered at the last minute that the word Elan was trademarked in a European country where DEC wished to conduct business. The company holding the trademark was the Slovenian sports equipment manufacturer Elan. To avoid litigation, DEC quickly renamed it to VAXELN by dropping the A, much to the disgruntlement of the developers. Some documentation and marketing material had already been printed referring to the product as ELAN, and samples of these posters were prized for many years by members of the original team.
