= PAL-11R =

Assembly programming language

PAL-11R is an assembly language, and an assembler, for the PDP-11's disk operating system, DOS-11. It was the precursor to MACRO-11.

The original assembler for Unix, as, was based on PAL-11R.
