= VAX MACRO =

Computer assembly language

- Paradigms: non-structured, imperative
- Family: assembly language
- Developer: Digital Equipment Corporation
- First appeared: 1977; 48 years ago
- Typing discipline: Untyped
- Scope: Lexical
- Implementation language: assembly language
- Platform: Native: VAX; With translation: Alpha, Itanium, x86-64
- OS: VMS

Influenced by
- MACRO-11

Influenced
- MACRO-64

VAX MACRO is the computer assembly language implementing the VAX instruction set architecture for the OpenVMS operating system, originally released by Digital Equipment Corporation (DEC) in 1977. A significant amount of VMS is written in VAX MACRO.

The syntax, directives, macro language, and lexical substitution operators of VAX MACRO formerly appeared in MACRO-11, the assembler for the PDP-11 series of computers. The MACRO-32 assembler supported the VAX processors developed and manufactured by DEC. It ran under the VMS operating system and produced object files suitable for the VMS linker. The MACRO-32 assembler and linker were bundled with the operating system.

== VAX MACRO on other architectures ==
The port of VMS to the DEC Alpha architecture led to the creation of a MACRO-32 compiler, which treated VAX MACRO as an input language and generated optimized Alpha object code. The MACRO-32 compiler was necessary since it was not feasible to rewrite the large quantity of VAX MACRO code present in the VMS operating system, layered products, and third-party software. The MACRO-32 compiler was subsequently ported to Itanium and x86-64 as OpenVMS was ported to those architectures.

Due to the difficulty of mapping low-level VAX semantics onto other architectures, most VAX MACRO programs written for the native VAX assembler require modification before they can be compiled with the MACRO-32 compiler. These changes include adding directives to explicitly define certain behaviours of the code, and removing code which relies on non-portable constructs. Furthermore, the MACRO-32 compiler allows direct access to certain Alpha architecture features, including Alpha's 32 registers, 64-bit addressing, and a subset of Alpha instructions. These are mapped onto equivalents on Itanium and x86-64, but are not supported by the original VAX MACRO assembler.

The OpenVMS assembler for Alpha assembly code is named MACRO-64. Despite sharing a similar name and macro syntax, MACRO-64 is otherwise unrelated to MACRO-32.
