= EVE (text editor) =

Text editor

EVE (introduced as the Extensible VAX Editor, later as the Extensible Versatile Editor) is a flexible text editor that is part of the VMS operating system. EVE is implemented by using the Text Processing Utility (TPU).

The Emacs editor features an EVE emulation (as an add-on).

== Editor control ==
EVE is invoked via:

$ EDIT/TPU filename[9]

Since the EVE editor was designed for use from a VT100 or VT220 terminal, many keyboard conventions introduced for personal computers do not work.

Key	Meaning
Exit the editor
F10	exit; saves the file and quits the editor
Ctrl-Z	exit; saves the file and quits the editor
Ctrl-Y	abort; terminates the editor without saving the file
Command line
(num.)	recall; recall the EVE command line (empty); enter Help to get the list of EVE commands
Ctrl-B	recall; recall the EVE command line (with previous command); use Ctrl-U to clear it
Text deleting
Backspace	erases the character to the left of the cursor
Ctrl-U	erase start of line; deletes everything to the left of the cursor to the start of the line
Ctrl-X	erase start of line; deletes everything to the left of the cursor to the start of the line
Ctrl-J	erase word; deletes the word under the cursor
7 (num.)	Select; starts text selection
8 (num.)	Remove; removes the text from the place where Select was used previously
9 (num.)	Insert here; inserts the text removed by the Remove
End	Select; starts text selection
Delete	Remove; removes the text from the place where Select was used previously
Insert	Insert here; inserts the text removed by the Remove
Mode changes
F11	change direction; changes direction of the F12 and of the searching (notice the state line indicating Forward or Reverse)
* (num.)	change direction; changes direction of the F12 and of the searching (notice the state line indicating Forward or Reverse)
Ctrl-A	change mode; switches between character insertion and overstrike (notice the state line indicating Insert or Overstrike)
Movements
←	cursor left
→	cursor right
↑	cursor up
↓	cursor down
1 (num.)	cursor left
3 (num.)	cursor right
5 (num.)	cursor up
2 (num.)	cursor down
Ctrl-E	end of line; put the cursor after the last character on the line
Ctrl-H	start of line; put the cursor to the line start
F12	next/previous line; direction can be changed with the F11 key
Text insertion
Ctrl-V	inserts a control character
Ctrl-I	tab; inserts horizontal tabelator
Ctrl-L	insert page break; inserts the FF (form feed) character on a new line
Ctrl-M	return; inserts end of line
More commands
Ctrl-S	freezes the screen output
Ctrl-Q	releases the screen output (the opposite of the Ctrl-S)
Ctrl-T	write the status in the form of machine::user 09:15:19 TPU CPU=00:00:00.67 PF=2524 IO=7447 MEM=628 to the status line
Ctrl-W	refresh; refreshes the screen
Ctrl-R	remember
NumLock	calls the Find command—enter a string to be found in the command line; the search direction is based on the direction set by the F11 key
Help
/ (num.)	displays the numeric keypad keys help
Help	enter the Help command in the command line to get the list of EVE commands

== Key function definitions ==
=== Interactive key definitions ===
To assign a command or function to a key or key combination, use the following procedure:

1. Enter the EVE command line (using the - key on the numeric keypad or Ctrl-B Ctrl-U)
2. Enter the Define Key command—as almost everywhere in OpenVMS the text is case insensitive and it is possible to use abbreviations, so entering de k will do
3. When the EVE command: prompt occurs, enter the name of the command
4. When the Press the key you want to define: prompt occurs, press the key or key combination which is to call the given command

=== Key definitions in a file ===
EVE upon its start interprets the EVE$INIT.EVE file in the user's current or home directory. When the SYS$LOGIN:EVE$INIT.EVE file contains

DEFINE KEY= Ctrl/F   Find
DEFINE KEY= F3       Find Next
DEFINE KEY= F1       Help
DEFINE KEY= F2       Do

the Ctrl-F key would call string search function, the F3 key repeating of the last search, the F1 key would display the list of EVE commands and the F2 key would call the EVE command line.

== Features ==
Automatic journaling facilitates recovering "all or most" of one's editing.

The TWO WINDOWS command allows editing more than one file at a time (split screen).
