= DATATRIEVE =

Database query and report writer tool

- Developer(s): VMS Software Inc. (originally Digital Equipment Corporation)
- Stable release: 7.4-1 / March 2017
- Operating system: OpenVMS, PDP-11 operating systems
- Available in: English

DATATRIEVE is a database query and report writer tool originally from Digital Equipment Corporation. It runs on the OpenVMS operating system, as well as several PDP-11 operating systems. DATATRIEVE's command structure is nearly plain English, and it is an early example of a Fourth Generation Language (4GL).

== Overview ==
DATATRIEVE works against flat files, indexed files, and databases. Such data files are delimited using record definitions stored in the Common Data Dictionary (CDD), or in RMS files. DATATRIEVE is used at many OpenVMS installations.

== History ==
DATATRIEVE was developed in the late 1970s and early 1980s by a team of software engineers at DEC's Central Commercial Engineering facilities in Merrimack and Nashua, New Hampshire, under database architect Jim Starkey. Many of the project's engineers went on to highly visible careers in database management and other software disciplines.

Version 1 for the PDP-11 was released in 1977; VAX DATATRIEVE was released in 1981 as part of the VAX Information Architecture.

DATATRIEVE adopted the wombat as its notional mascot; the program's help file responded to “HELP WOMBAT” with factual information about real world wombats.

== Examples of DATATRIEVE usage ==
DATATRIEVE queries and commands approach plain English sentence structure, though would not be considered natural language, since a precise sentence structure must be used:

DTR> FOR FAMILIES WITH NUMBER_KIDS = 2

CON> PRINT KID_NAME, AGE OF KIDS WITH AGE GT 20

DATATRIEVE can also be used to modify data:

DTR> FOR FAMILIES MODIFY EACH_KID OF FIRST 1 KIDS

Enter KID_NAME:

DATATRIEVE can also cross multiple datasets, creating joined data views:

DTR> PRINT NAME, TYPE, PRICE OF

CON> YACHTS CROSS OWNERS OVER TYPE
