= As (Unix) =

as is a generic command name for an assembler on Unix.

== Implementations ==
More than one assembler for Unix and Unix-like operating systems has been implemented with an executable called as. Users may be able to determine which implementation (if any) is present on their system by consulting the system's manuals, or by running as --version.

=== AT&T / Bell Labs ===
As of November 1971, an assembler invoked as as was available for Unix. Implemented by Bell Labs staff, it was based upon the Digital Equipment Corporation's PAL-11R assembler.

=== GNU Assembler ===
Circa 1986, the GNU Assembler ("GAS") became available. As with the original UNIX assembler, GAS's executable is simply named as. As of 2018, GAS implements many features that were not present in the 1971 Bell Labs implementation.
