= List of MIPS architecture processors =

This is a list of processors that implement the MIPS instruction set architecture, sorted by year, process size, frequency, die area, and so on. These processors are designed by Imagination Technologies, MIPS Technologies, and others. It displays an overview of the MIPS processors with performance and functionality versus capabilities for the more recent MIPS Aptiv families.

== MIPS Computer Systems/MIPS Technologies ==
MIPS version	Processor	Year	Process (nm)	Frequency (MHz)	Transistors (millions)	Die area (mm^{2})	Pin count	Power (W)	Voltage (V)	D. cache (KB)	I. cache (KB)	MMU	L2 cache	L3 cache	Features
MIPS I	R2000	1985	2000	8 to 16.67	0.11	80				64 external	64 external		none	none	5 stage pipelines, FPU: 2010
MIPS I	R3000	1988	1200	12 to 40	0.11	40	145, 172	4		32-256 external	32-256 external		0-1 MB external	none	same as R2000; FPU: 3010
MIPS II	R6000	1990		60 to 66						external	external		none	none	32-bit register size, 36-bit physical address, FPU
MIPS III	R4000	1991	800	100	1.35	213	179	15	5	8	8		128 KB to 4 MB external	none	
MIPS III	R4400	1992	600	100 to 250	2.3	186	179	15	5, 3.3	16	16		128 KB to 4 MB external	none	
MIPS III	R4200	1993	600	80	1.3	81	179	1.8-2.0	3.3	8	16		128 KB to 4 MB external	none	scalar design with a five-stage classic RISC pipeline
MIPS III	R4300i	1995	350	100 / 133		45	120	2.2	3.3					none	
MIPS III	R4600	1994	640	100 / 133	2.2	77	179	4.6	5	16	16		512 KB external	none	
MIPS III	R4650	1994	640	133 / 180	2.2	77	179	4.6	5	16	16		512 KB external	none	
MIPS III	R4640	1995	640				179							none	
MIPS III	R4700	1996	500	100 to 200	2.2		179			16	16		External	none	
MIPS IV	R5000	1996	350	150 to 200	3.7	84	223	10	3.3	32	32		1 MB external	none	
MIPS IV	RM7000	1998	250, 180, 130	250 to 600	18	91	304	10, 6, 3	3.3, 2.5, 1.5	16	16		256 KB internal	1 MB external	
MIPS IV	R8000	1994	700	75 to 90	2.6	299	591	30	3.3	16	16		4 MB external	none	superscalar, up to 4 instructions per cycle
MIPS IV	R10000	1996	350, 250	150 to 250	6.7	350	599	30	3.3	32	32		512 KB – 16 MB external	none	
MIPS IV	R12000	1998	350, 250	270 to 360	7.15	229	600	20	4	32	32		512 KB – 16 MB external	none	single-chip 4-issue superscalar
MIPS IV	R12000A	2000	180	400										none	
MIPS IV	R14000	2001	130	500	7.2	204	527	17		32	32		512 KB – 16 MB external	none	
MIPS IV	R14000A	2002	130	600				17		32	32			none	
MIPS IV	R16000	2003	110	700 to 1000				20		64	64		512 KB – 16 MB external	none	
MIPS IV	R16000A	2004	110	800 to 1000						64	64			none	
MIPS IV	R18000	2001	130						1.2	32	32		1 MB	0-64 MB external, on-chip tag	was planned, but not manufactured
MIPS V	H1 "Beast"													none	was planned, but not manufactured
MIPS V	H2 "Capitan"													none	was planned, but not manufactured
MIPS32	4K	1999	180	167		2.5								none	
MIPS32	4KE		90	420		1.2								none	
MIPS32	24K	2003	130, 65, 40	400 (130 nm) 750 (65 nm) 1468 (40 nm)		0.83				0 to 64	0 to 64		4–16 MB external	none	
MIPS32	24KE	2003	130, 65, 40											none	
MIPS32	34K	2006	90, 65, 40	500 (90 nm) 1454 (40 nm)										none	
MIPS32	74K	2007	65	1110		2.5				0 to 64	0 to 64			none	
MIPS32	1004K	2008	65	1100		4.7				8 to 64	8 to 64			none	
MIPS32	M14K	2009	130	200										none	MicroMIPS
MIPS32	1074K	2010	40	1500										none	
MIPS32	1074Kf	2010	40											none	Floating point
MIPS32	microAptiv	2012	90, 65							8 to 64	8 to 64			none	
MIPS32	interAptiv	2012								4 to 64	4 to 64		up to 8 MB internal	none	
MIPS32	proAptiv	2012								32 or 64	32 or 64		up to 8 MB internal	none	
MIPS64	5K	1999													
MIPS64	20K	2000													
MIPS version	Processor	Year	Process (nm)	Frequency (MHz)	Transistors (millions)	Die area (mm^{2})	Pin count	Power (W)	Voltage (V)	D. cache (KB)	I. cache (KB)	MMU	L2 cache	L3 cache	Features

== Imagination Technologies ==
MIPS Technologies was acquired 17 December 2012, by Imagination Technologies. Since then, the following processors have been introduced by Imagination Technologies.

Imagination Technologies sold MIPS processor rights to Tallwood MIPS Inc in 2017. MIPS Technologies was acquired by Wave Computing in 2018, where "MIPS operates as an IP licensing business unit".

The Warrior P-Class CPU was announced on 14 October 2013.

The CPU IP cores comprising the MIPS Series5 ‘Warrior’ family are based on MIPS32 release 5 and MIPS64 release 6, and will come in three classes of performance and features:

- 'Warrior M-class': entry-level MIPS cores for embedded and microcontroller applications, a progression from the popular microAptiv family
- 'Warrior I-class': mid-range, feature-rich MIPS CPUs following on from the highly efficient interAptiv family. The I6400, with its 64-bit core, was launched September 2014.
- 'Warrior P-class': high-performance MIPS processors building on the proAptiv family

MIPS version	level	Processor	Year	Process (nm)	Frequency (GHz)	Transistors (billions)	Die area (mm^{2})	Pin count	Power (W)	Voltage (V)	D. cache (KB)	I. cache (KB)	MMU	L2 cache	L3 cache	Features
MIPS32 Release 5	Warrior-P	P5600	2013	?	1.0 to 2.0	?	?	?	?	?	32/64	32/64	TLb	Up to 8 MB external	none	VZ, MSA
MIPS32 Release 5	Warrior-M	M5100	2014	65/28	0.1 to 0.497	?	0.04 to 0.77	?			none	none	FMT	none	none	VZ
MIPS32 Release 5	Warrior-M	M5150	2014	65/28	0.372/0.576	?	0.89/0.26	?			up to 64	up to 64	TLB	none	none	VZ
MIPS64 Release 6	Warrior-P	P6600	2015	28	Up to 2.0	?	?	?	?	?	32/64	32/64	TLB	0.5 - 8 MB external	none	SMT, VZ
MIPS64 Release 6	Warrior-I	I6400	2014	28	1.0	?	1/core	?	?	?	32/64	32/64	TLB	0.5 - 8 MB external	none	SMT, VZ
MIPS64 Release 6	Warrior-M	M6200	2015	65/40/28	up to 0.750	?	0.19	?			none	none	FMT	none	none	
MIPS64 Release 6	Warrior-M	M6250	2015	65/40/28	up to 0.750	?	0.23	?			up to 64	up to 64	TLB	none	none	XPA
MIPS version	level	Processor	Year	Process (nm)	Frequency (GHz)	Transistors (billions)	Die area (mm^{2})	Pin count	Power (W)	Voltage (V)	D. cache (KB)	I. cache (KB)	MMU	L2 cache	L3 cache	Features

== Other designers ==
A number of companies licensed the MIPS architecture and developed their own processors.

MIPS version	Licensee	Processor	Features	Year	Process (nm)	Frequency (MHz)	Transistors (millions)	Die size (mm^{2})	Pin count	Power (W)	Voltage (V)	D. cache (KB)	I. cache (KB)	MMU	L2 cache	L3 cache
MIPS I	Lexra	LX4080, LX4180, LX4280, LX5280, LX8000														
MIPS II	НИИСИ РАН	KOMDIV-32														
MIPS III	Sony Computer Entertainment + Toshiba	Emotion Engine														
MIPS III	НИИСИ РАН	KOMDIV-64														
MIPS32	Alchemy Semiconductor	Au1														
MIPS32	Broadcom	BMIPS3000														
MIPS32	Broadcom	BMIPS4000														
MIPS32	Broadcom	BMIPS5000				1300										
MIPS32	Broadcom	BCM53001			65	400						32	32			
MIPS32	Broadcom	BCM1255														
MIPS32	Ingenic Semiconductor	XBurst 1	single issue, 8-stage pipeline	2005	180, 130, 64, 40	240				0.15	1.8	16	16	yes	none	none
MIPS32	Ingenic Semiconductor	XBurst 2	dual-issue/dual-threaded	2013	40	1200				0.15	1.8	32	32	yes	512	none
MIPS64	SiByte	SB1														
MIPS64	Broadcom	BCM1125H				400-800				4w @ 400 MHz		32	32	yes	256 KB	
MIPS64	Broadcom	BCM1255	Dual-core, DDR2, 4× Gigabit LAN			800-1200				13 W @ 1 GHz		32	32	yes	512 KB	
MIPS64	Cavium	Octeon: CN30xx, CN31xx, CN36xx, CN38xx		2006												
MIPS64	Cavium	Octeon Plus: CN5xxx		2007												
MIPS64	Cavium	Octeon II: CN6xxx		2009												
MIPS64	Cavium	Octeon III: CN7xxx		2012												
MIPS64	NEC	VR4305														
MIPS64	NEC	VR4310		1997	250	100,133,167										
MIPS64	NEC	VR5432		1998		167										
MIPS64	NEC	VR5464		1998		200-250										
MIPS64	NXP Semiconductors	??														
MIPS64	NXP Semiconductors	??														
CAS: ICT	none yet															
CAS: ICT	??															
MIPS version	Licensee	Processor	Features	Year	Process (nm)	Frequency (MHz)	Transistors (millions)	Die size (mm^{2})	Pin count	Power (W)	Voltage (V)	D. cache (KB)	I. cache (KB)	MMU	L2 cache	L3 cache

== Other ==
- PhysX P1 - A multi-core physics processing unit that contains MIPS cores
