= KOMDIV =

KOMDIV may refer to:

- Comdiv, a deprecated military rank in the Red Army
- KOMDIV-32, a family of 32-bit microprocessors developed by NIISI, Russia
- KOMDIV-64, a 64-bit microprocessor developed by NIISI, Russia
