= Whitechapel Computer Works =

Defunct computer company

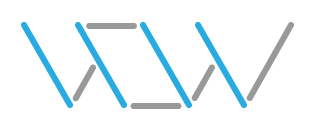
Logo for Whitechapel Computer Works Ltd (WCW).

Whitechapel Computer Works Ltd. (WCW) was a computer workstation company founded in the East End of London, United Kingdom in April 1983 by Timothy Eccles and Bob Newman, with a combined investment of £1 million from the Greater London Enterprise Board (£100,000 initially), venture capital companies Newmarket and Baillie Gifford, and the Department of Trade and Industry. The company was situated in the Whitechapel Technology Centre—a council-funded high-technology enterprise hub—and began the design of their first workstation model in August 1983, shipping the first units by September 1984.

== MG-1 Workstation ==
The company's first workstation model was the MG-1 (named after the Milliard Gargantubrain from The Hitchhiker's Guide to the Galaxy). The MG-1 was based on the National Semiconductor NS32016 microprocessor, with 512 KB of RAM (expandable to 8 MB), a 1024 × 800 pixel monochrome display, a 10, 22 or 45 MB hard disk, 800 KB floppy drive, and an optional Ethernet interface, with prices stated as being equivalent to $6,975 for the 10 MB hard disk system, $8,250 for the 22 MB system and $9,500 for the 45 MB system. UK pricing was given as £5,495, £6,495 and £7,495 for the respective configurations.

The product was claimed to be "the first $10,000 personal work station", comparable to the HP 9000 series but more competitively priced, and was initially aimed at computer-aided design and computer-aided manufacturing applications. A contemporary evaluation of a 40 MB hard disk system with 2 MB RAM lists an approximate acquisition price of £9,000. While there was no distributor in the United States, the MG-1 was sold in North America by Cybertool Systems Ltd. from 1984 through 1986. A colour version, the CG-1, was also announced in 1986, followed by the MG-200, with an NS32332 processor, in March 1987.

The MG-1 employed an 8 MHz 32016 CPU with 32082 memory management unit (MMU) and 32081 floating-point unit (FPU), with the MMU being noted in a 1985 article as "suffering from bugs" and being situated on its own board providing hardware fixes. In order to deliver the machine at prices closer to personal computers than contemporary workstations (such as Sun, Apollo and Perq), design techniques from the personal computer industry were adopted, with a single eight-layer system board being used to hold the CPU and other integrated circuits. The 32201 timing and control unit (TCU) and 32202 interrupt control unit (ICU) were also employed by the MG-1.

Initially, NatSemi's Genix operating system, described as being based on Unix System III with 4.1BSD enhancements, or just 4.1BSD, was provided. NatSemi's Unix roadmap in 1984 advertised forthcoming 4.2BSD features and a "generic port of UNIX System V". However, during 1985, Genix was replaced on the MG-1 by a port of 4.2BSD called 42nix and augmented with the Oriel graphical user interface to give a reported factor of six performance improvement in graphics performance, Oriel being partially kernel-based. The kernel-based screen driver in this architecture managed window viewports, called panels, and updated the display using panel contents copied from raster images that were prepared in separate memory regions by applications.

In order to improve responsiveness and reduce the latency observed with contemporary Unix systems, the mouse position was tracked using a dedicated processor which also monitored the keyboard for events, and a form of hardware mouse pointer was used, with the pointer bitmap being stored in its own 64-pixel buffer as a kind of overlay, this being combined with the main display image to produce the final screen image. The machine also featured a "soft power switch" similar to that provided by the Apple Lisa (and also the slightly later Torch Triple X) which initiated "an orderly UNIX shutdown".

Realising that the price of the MG-1, at around £5,495, would need to be reflected in the physical appearance of the MG-1, Whitechapel engaged industrial designers Fether & Partners to produce a design for the different units of the system. The collaboration eventually settled on locating most of the electronics in a single "two-tier" box reminiscent of stacked hi-fi systems, with the monitor a separate unit that could be placed on top of the main unit or alongside. The main unit was also designed to be stood on its end.

While the MG-1 provided a monochrome display with a 1024 x 800 resolution, the CG-1 provided a 768 x 512 resolution supporting 256 colours from a palette of approximately 256,000 colours. Unlike the MG-1, the CG-1 employed a separate framebuffer fitted in an expansion slot to refresh the display, with screen data being copied to this framebuffer from the main system memory when updating the framebuffer contents. The MG-200 preserved the resolution of the MG-1 but introduced the faster NS32332 processor along with faster RAM which was dual-ported to give the processor and display direct access via a 64-bit data path. A colour CG-200 variant of the MG-200 was also available.

== History and legacy ==
WCW went into receivership in 1986, but were soon revived as Whitechapel Workstations Ltd. The new company, described as "a briefly flowering UK-based UNIX workstation company that shipped the first MIPS desktop computers in 1987", initially announced the MG-300 based on the MIPS architecture with a performance rating of 8 to 10 million instructions per second as part of a strategy to pursue sales in the US market via original equipment manufacturers and value-added resellers, with the company's management having been reconstituted to include "one-half new and one-half old staff". The MG-300 model was subsequently launched as the Hitech-10, featuring the MIPS R2000 processor, this being followed by the Hitech-20 with a MIPS R3000 processor, subsequently known as the Mistral-20. These ran the UMIPS variant of UNIX, with either X11 or NeWS-based GUIs, and were aimed at computer animation applications.

Whitechapel had reportedly sold as many as 1,000 workstations from its first range, these having been "particularly successful" in the London financial industry, and was aiming to increase production levels by relocating manufacturing from the UK to West Germany. The largest single user of the MG-1 was probably The City University (now City, University of London) which purchased and installed 140. Other academic users included Queen Mary College, the University of Lancaster, amongst "about a dozen" research institutes and universities in the UK. The MG-1 also found use as a silicon design workstation, equipped by European Silicon Structures to run that company's SOLO software suite, and by Lattice Logic to run that company's Chipsmith package. Whitechapel positioned the MG-series for publishing applications as the MG-Series Publishing Workstation based on the MG-1 and MG-200 models, bundling the PrintMaster technical publishing software along with a scanner.

However, the company entered receivership in April 1988. Its assets related to the Hitech-10 were purchased in June 1988 by a consortium, Computer Hitech International, which adopted the corporate identity Mistral Computer Systems. Mistral subcontracted the design of its systems to Algorithmics Ltd., this being "essentially the rump of the old Whitechapel design team". Algorithmics was later acquired by MIPS Technologies in 2002.

Mistral launched the Mistral-20 workstation in late 1989, based on a 25 MHz R3000 processor and running Unix SVR3 with BSD 4.3 extensions. Despite anticipating a product based on the R6000, the company adjusted its plans to target the R4000 in its next product, also seeking to reduce its dependency on its existing German manufacturing partner and aiming to bring production back to the UK. Such plans were evidently never realised, with certain assets from Mistral being acquired by Amstral Workstation Solutions along with other businesses, with the resulting company, ABC Workstation Solutions, becoming a reseller of Hewlett-Packard, Apple and Sun products.
