= KOMDIV-32 =

General information
- Launched: 1999; 27 years ago
- Designed by: NIISI
- Common manufacturers: NIISI; Mikron; MVC Nizhny Novgorod

Performance
- Max. CPU clock rate: 33 MHz to 125 MHz

Physical specifications
- Cores: 1

Architecture and classification
- Technology node: 0.25 μm to 0.5 μm
- Instruction set: MIPS I

The KOMDIV-32 (Russian: КОМДИВ-32) is a family of 32-bit microprocessors developed and manufactured by the Scientific Research Institute of System Development (NIISI) of the Russian Academy of Sciences. The manufacturing plant of NIISI is located in Dubna on the grounds of the Kurchatov Institute. The KOMDIV-32 processors are intended primarily for spacecraft applications and many of them are radiation hardened (rad-hard).

These microprocessors are compatible with MIPS R3000 and have an integrated MIPS R3010 compatible floating-point unit.

== Overview ==
Designation		Production start (year)	Process (nm)	Clock rate (MHz)	Remarks
Russian	English	Production start (year)	Process (nm)	Clock rate (MHz)	Remarks
1В812	1V812	?	500	33	
1890ВМ1Т	1890VM1T	2000	500	50	rad-hard
1890ВМ2Т	1890VM2T	2003	350	90	
1990ВМ2Т	1990VM2T	2008 ?	350	66	rad-hard
5890ВМ1Т	5890VM1Т	2009	500	33	rad-hard
5890ВЕ1Т	5890VE1Т	2009	500	33	rad-hard
1900ВМ2Т	1900VM2T	2012	350	66	rad-hard
1904ВЕ1Т	1904VE1T	2016	350	40	
1907ВМ014	1907VM014	2016	250	100	rad-hard
1907ВМ038	1907VM038	2016 ?	250	125	rad-hard
1907ВМ044	1907VM044	2016 ?	250	66	rad-hard
1907ВМ056	1907VM056	2016 ?	250	100	rad-hard
1907ВМ066	1907VM066	2016 ?	250	100	rad-hard
1907ВК016	1907VK016	?	250	100	rad-hard

== Details ==
=== 1V812 ===
- 0.5 μm CMOS process, 3-layer metal
- 108-pin ceramic quad flat package (QFP)
- 1.5 million transistors, 8KB L1 instruction cache, 8KB L1 data cache, compatible with IDT 79R3081E

=== 1890VM1T ===
- 0.5 μm CMOS process

=== 1890VM2T ===
- 0.35 μm CMOS process

=== 1990VM2T ===
- 0.35 μm silicon on insulator (SOI) CMOS process
- 108-pin ceramic Quad Flat Package (QFP)
- working temperature from -60 to 125 °C

=== 5890VM1Т ===
- 0.5 μm silicon on insulator (SOI) CMOS process
- 108-pin ceramic quad flat package (QFP)
- cache (8KB each for data and instructions)
- working temperature from -60 to 125 °C

=== 5890VE1Т ===
- 0.5 μm SOI CMOS process
- 240-pin ceramic QFP
- radiation tolerance to not less than 200 kRad, working temperature from -60 to 125 °C
- System-on-a-chip (SoC) including PCI master / slave, 16 GPIO, 3 UART, 3 32-bit timers
- cache (8KB each for data and instructions)
- second-sourced by MVC Nizhny Novgorod under the name 1904VE1T (Russian: 1904ВЕ1Т) with a clock rate of 40 MHz

=== 1900VM2T ===
- development name Rezerv-32
- 0.35 μm SOI CMOS process
- 108-pin ceramic QFP
- radiation tolerance to not less than 200 kRad, working temperature from -60 to 125 °C
- triple modular redundancy on block level with self-healing
- both registers and cache (4KB each for data and instructions) are implemented as dual interlocked storage cells (DICE)

=== 1907VM014 ===
- 0.25 μm SOI CMOS process; manufacturing to be moved to Mikron
- 256-pin ceramic QFP
- production planned for 2016 (previously this device was planned to go into production in 2014 under the name 1907VE1T or 1907VM1T)
- radiation tolerance to not less than 200 kRad
- SoC including SpaceWire, GOST R 52070-2003 (Russian version of MIL-STD-1553), SPI, 32 GPIO, 2 UART, 3 timers, JTAG
- cache (8KB each for data and instructions)

=== 1907VM038 ===
- development name Skhema-10
- 0.25 μm SOI CMOS process; manufacturing to be moved to Mikron
- 675-pin ceramic BGA
- SoC including SpaceWire, GOST R 52070-2003 (MIL-STD-1553), RapidIO, SPI, I²C, 16 GPIO, 2 UART, 3 32-bit timers, JTAG, DSP (same command set as DSP in 1890VM7Ya)
- DDR2 SDRAM controller with ECC
- cache (8KB each for data and instructions)
- working temperature from -60 to 125 °C

=== 1907VM044 ===
- development name Obrabotka-10
- 0.25 μm SOI CMOS process; manufactured by Mikron
- 256-pin ceramic QFP
- SoC including SpaceWire, GOST R 52070-2003 (MIL-STD-1553), SPI, 32 GPIO, 2 UART, 3 timers, JTAG
- radiation tolerance to not less than 200 kRad
- triple modular redundancy in processor core
- both registers and cache (4KB each for data and instructions) are implemented as dual interlocked storage cells (DICE) with 1 parity bit per byte for cache and Hamming code for registers
- SECDED for external memory
- working temperature from -60 to 125 °C

=== 1907VM056 ===
- development name Skhema-23
- 0.25 μm SOI CMOS process; manufactured by Mikron
- 407-pin ceramic PGA
- SoC including 8-channel SpaceWire, GOST R 52070-2003 (MIL-STD-1553), SPI, I²C, CAN bus, 32 GPIO, 2 UART, 3 timers, JTAG
- cache (8KB each for data and instructions)

=== 1907VM066 ===
- development name Obrabotka-26
- 0.25 μm silicon on insulator (SOI) CMOS process; manufactured by Mikron
- 407-pin ceramic PGA
- SoC including 4-channel SpaceWire, GOST R 52070-2003 (MIL-STD-1553), SPI, I²C, RapidIO, GPIO, 2 UART, 3 timers, JTAG, PCI, co-processor for image processing
- cache (8KB each for data and instructions)

=== 1907VK016 ===
- development name Obrabotka-29
- 0.25 μm silicon on insulator (SOI) CMOS process; manufactured by Mikron
- PGA
- SoC including 4-channel SpaceWire, GOST R 52070-2003 (MIL-STD-1553), SPI, 32 GPIO, 2 UART, 3 timers, 128KB SRAM
- triple modular redundancy in processor core

== See also ==
- KOMDIV-64, 64-bit MIPS processors developed by NIISI
- Mongoose-V, a 32-bit MIPS processor for spacecraft applications developed for NASA
- Soviet integrated circuit designation
