= KOMDIV-64 =

64-bit microprocessor

General information
- Launched: 2007; 18 years ago
- Designed by: NIISI

Performance
- Max. CPU clock rate: 200 MHz to 1.3 GHz

Architecture and classification
- Technology node: 28 nm to 0.35 μm
- Instruction set: MIPS IV

Physical specifications
- Cores: 1 to 2

The KOMDIV-64 (Russian: КОМДИВ-64) is a family of 64-bit microprocessors developed by the Scientific Research Institute of System Development (NIISI) of the Russian Academy of Sciences and manufactured by TSMC, UMC, GlobalFoundries, and X-Fab. The KOMDIV-64 processors are primarily intended for industrial and high-performance computing applications.

These microprocessors implement the MIPS IV instruction set architecture (ISA).

== Overview ==
Designation		Cores	In production since	Process (nm)	Clock rate (MHz)	Remarks / References
Russian	English	Cores	In production since	Process (nm)	Clock rate (MHz)	Remarks / References
1990ВМ3Т	1990VM3T	1	2005	350	120	
1890ВМ5Ф	1890VM5F	1	2008	350	350	
1890ВМ6Я	1890VM6Ya	1	2011	180	270	
1890ВМ7Я	1890VM7Ya	1	2011	180	200	
1890ВМ8Я	1890VM8Ya	2	2016	65	800	
1890ВМ9Я	1890VM9Ya	2	2016	65	750	
1890ВМ108	1890VM108	1	2021	65	800	
1890ВМ118	1890VM118	2	2019	28	1300	
1890ВМ128	1890VM128	1	2019	65	800	
1907BM028	1907VM028	1	2016	250	150	rad-hard
К5500ВК018	K5500VK018	1	2021	65	300	

== Nomenclature ==
Many microprocessors listed here are following version 2000 of the soviet integrated circuit designation.

== Details ==
=== 1990VM3T ===
- 0.35 μm CMOS process
- 240-pin QFP

=== 1890VM5F ===
- 0.35 μm CMOS process
- 16 KB L1 instruction cache, 16 KB L1 data cache, 256 KB L2 cache
- in-order, dual-issue superscalar; 5-stage integer pipeline, 7-stage floating point pipeline
- 26.6 million transistors
- compatible with PMC-Sierra RM7000
- performance: 0.68 dhrystones/MHz, 1.03 whetstones/MHz, 1.09 coremarks/MHz

=== 1890VM6Ya ===
- 0.18 μm CMOS process
- 16 KB L1 instruction cache, 16 KB L1 data cache, 256 KB L2 cache
- 680-pin BGA
- System-on-a-chip (SoC) including a PCI controller, 5 64-bit timers, RapidIO, Ethernet 100/10 Mbit/s, USB 2.0, I²C
- performance: 0.90 dhrystones/MHz, 1.32 whetstones/MHz, 1.47 coremarks/MHz

=== 1890VM7Ya ===
- 0.18 μm CMOS process
- 16 KB L1 instruction cache, 16 KB L1 data cache, 32 KB general-purpose SRAM
- 680-pin BGA
- System-on-a-chip (SoC) including a PCI controller, 3 64-bit timers, RapidIO, I²C, SPI, 128-bit DSP with 4 cores and 64 KB RAM per core

=== 1890VM8Ya ===
- 65 nm CMOS process; manufactured at TSMC
- 32 KB L1 instruction cache, 16 KB L1 data cache, 512 KB L2 cache
- 1294-pin BGA
- System-on-a-chip (SoC) including a PCI controller, 5 64-bit timers, RapidIO, Ethernet 1000/100/10 Mbit/s, USB 2.0, I²C, SPI, SATA 3.0

=== 1890VM9Ya ===
- 65 nm CMOS process; manufactured at TSMC
- 1294-pin BGA
- System-on-a-chip (SoC) including RapidIO, Ethernet 1000 Mbit/s, USB 2.0, SATA 3.0
- power consumption 12 W, temperature range -60 °C to +85 °C

=== 1890VM108 ===
- 65 nm CMOS process; manufactured at TSMC
- 32 KB L1 instruction cache, 16 KB L1 data cache, 512 KB L2 cache
- System-on-a-chip (SoC) including a PCI controller, Ethernet 1000/100/10 Mbit/s, USB 2.0, I²C, SPI, CAN 2.0, SATA 3.0
- power consumption 7 W, temperature range -60 °C to +85 °C

=== 1890VM118 ===
- 28 nm CMOS process; manufactured at TSMC
- System-on-a-chip (SoC) including a PCI controller, Ethernet 1000/100/10 Mbit/s, USB 2.0, I²C, SPI, CAN 2.0, SATA 3.0, graphics co-processor
- power consumption 9 W, temperature range -60 °C to +85 °C

=== 1890VM128 ===
- 65 nm CMOS process; manufactured at TSMC
- System-on-a-chip (SoC) including a PCI controller, Ethernet 1000/100/10 Mbit/s, USB 2.0, I²C, SPI, graphics co-processor
- power consumption 20 W, temperature range -60 °C to +85 °C

=== 1907VM028 ===
- 0.25 μm silicon on insulator (SOI) CMOS process; manufacturing to be moved to Mikron Group
- 128 KB L2 cache
- 675-pin BGA
- System-on-a-chip (SoC) including RapidIO, Ethernet, PCI, I²C

=== K5500VK018 ===
- 65 nm CMOS process; contains only Russian IP blocks
- 128 KB L2 cache
- 265-pin BGA
- System-on-a-chip (SoC) including Ethernet 100/10 Mbit/s, USB 2.0, I²C, SPI, CAN 2.0, SDIO, 8-channel ADC, 4-channel DAC, RTC
- power consumption 0.5 W, temperature range -40 °C to +85 °C

== See also ==
- KOMDIV-32
