= Bipolar Integrated Technology =

Semiconductor company (defunct)

Bit, Inc.
- Formerly: Bipolar Integrated Technology, Inc.
- Company type: Private
- Industry: Computer
- Founded: 1983; 43 years ago in Beaverton, Oregon, United States
- Defunct: 1996; 30 years ago
- Fate: Acquired by PMC-Sierra
- Products: Semiconductor
- Number of employees: 250 (peak)

Bipolar Integrated Technology, Inc. (BIT), later Bit, Inc., was a privately held semiconductor company based in Beaverton, Oregon, which sold products implemented with emitter-coupled logic technology. The company was founded in 1983 by former Floating Point Systems, Intel, and Tektronix engineers. The company, which occupied a 46,000-square-foot manufacturing facility at the Oregon Graduate Center, raised $36 million in start-up capital within three years of its foundation.

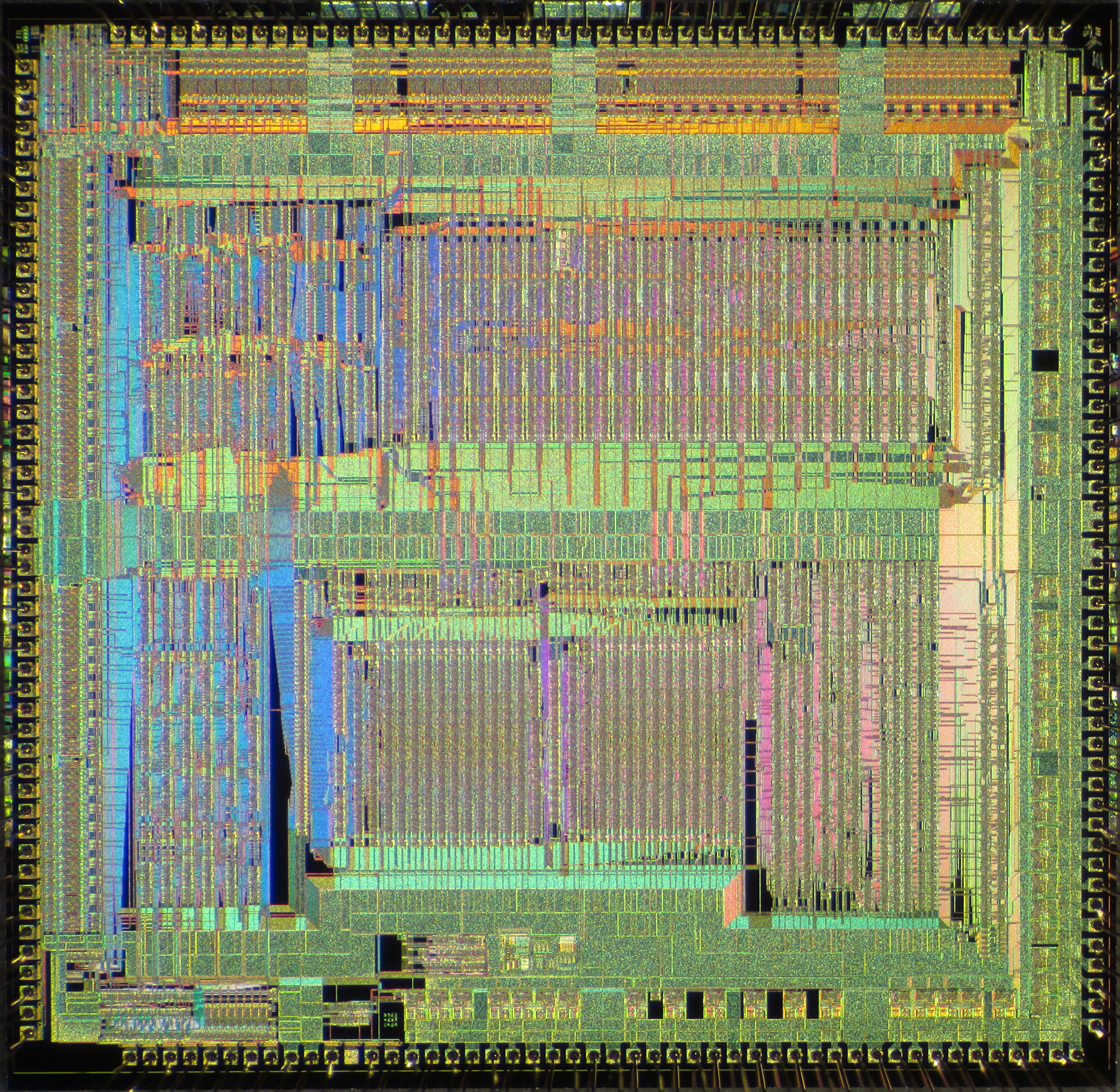
Die shot of a BIT B2110 floating point multiplier

The initial product was a floating-point co-processor chipset. Later, the company produced the B5000 SPARC ECL microprocessor (never reached production in a Sun Microsystems product, though used by Floating Point Systems). They also produced the R6000 MIPS ECL microprocessor, which did reach production as a MIPS minicomputer. Initial yields of the R6000 were very poor, leading to parts shortages for MIPS Computer Systems; the latter company attributed its first quarterly loss in October 1990 to BIT. The two signed an agreement in June 1991 to allow BIT to market the R6000 on the open market, dissolving the previous exclusivity agreement with MIPS.

Under its new president Fred Hanson, BIT had its first profitable year in 1991, reaching peak revenues of $20 million. Revenues dropped the following year to about $10 million, however, after it had lost four of its largest customers, including MIPS, Floating Point, and Control Data. The company eventually entered the telecommunications market with Asynchronous Transfer Mode (ATM) devices and Ethernet switches. The company was acquired by PMC-Sierra in September 1996 for these later communications products.
