= Diagnostic board =

In electronic systems a diagnostic board is a specialized device with diagnostic circuitry on a printed circuit board that connects to a computer or other electronic equipment replacing an existing module, or plugging into an expansion card slot.

A multi-board electronic system such as a computer comprises multiple printed circuit boards or cards connected via connectors. When a fault occurs in the system, it is sometimes possible to isolate or identify the fault by replacing one of the boards with a diagnostic board. A diagnostic board can range from extremely simple to extremely sophisticated.

Simple standard diagnostic plug-in boards for computers are available that display numeric codes to assist in identifying issues detected during the power-on self-test executed automatically during system startup.

== Dummy board ==
A dummy board provides a minimal interface. This type of diagnostic board in intended to confirm that the interface is correctly implemented. For example, a PC motherboard manufacturer can test PCI functionality of a PC motherboard by connecting a dummy PCI board into each PCI slot on the motherboard

== Extender board ==
An extender board (or board extender, card extender, extender card) is a simple circuit board that interposes between a card cage backplane and the circuit board of interest to physically 'extend' the circuit board of interest out from the card cage allowing access to both sides of the circuit board to connect diagnostic equipment such as an oscilloscope or systems analyzer. For example, a PCI extender board can be plugged into a PCI slot on a computer motherboard, and then a PCI card connected to the extender board to 'extend' the board into free space for access. This approach was common in the 1970s and 1980s particularly on S-100 bus systems.

The concept can become unworkable when signal timing is affected by the length of the signal paths on the diagnostic board, as well as introducing Radio Frequency Interference (RFI) into the circuit under test because of a lack of adequate shielding.

The use of extender boards is declining because of the wider use of multilayer flexible circuit boards and overall cheaper components, particularly in the consumer end of the electronics market.

== Sources ==
Vector Electronics & Technology in North Hollywood Calif. is one of the few companies still making these legacy boards.
