= Mikron Group =

Russian electronics manufacturer

- Industry: Semiconductor device fabrication
- Founded: 1964
- Headquarters: Zelenograd, Russia
- Revenue: 6.686B Rubles (2017)
- Net income: 1.624B Rubles (2017)
- Number of employees: ca. 1400

Mikron Group (Russian: Группа Микрон) is a manufacturer of semiconductor devices in Russia. It has manufacturing facilities in Zelenograd, St.Petersburg and Voronezh.

== History ==
The plant started as a part of NIIME (Scientific and research institute of molecular electronics), when the Soviet Union attempted follow the Western countries' development on microelectronics.

The plant had adopted its current name and became a standalone entity by 1970. The USSR invested heavily in Mikron, and developed technologies used for the Soviet space program there. The Elbrus computer systems was first produced by that time.

The 1980s US embargo on hi-tech exports affected USSR's ability to produce new chips. Unable to come up with new designs, Mikron and other semiconductor manufacturers resorted to copying foreign designs through the means of reverse-engineering. The ES EVM computer system of the era are unlicensed replicas of the IBM/360 series, and the two were generally compatible.

Following Soviet Union's opening to international trades in 1990, Mikron was contracted by Samsung to manufacture chips for wrist watches and calculators. The company collaborated with STMicroelectronics to start a 180 nm process node in 2007.

Mikron obtained a license to import 90 nm process in 2010. The design and production facilities cost a total of 16.57 billion Rubles, about half of it was financed by Rusnano. Production started in 2012-2013.

Mikron first taped-out experimental 65 nm samples in 2013; it has never produced any 65 nm products as of 2024.

Due to quality control issues, the scheduled production of the Elbrus-2SM never started, with the processor eventually manufactured entirely by TSMC. After international sanctions for Russia's 2022 invasion of Ukraine, TSMC cut ties with the Mikron and supply of Elbrus-2SM ceased, forcing Mikron to bring the production back to its own facilities again. Instead of TSMC's 28 nm process from 2010, the new chips are produced with the 90 nm process from 2003.

By early 2023, Mikron's production consisted entirely of chips for contactless smart cards (i.e., transit cards). It started constructing a new plant in Zelenograd.

Mikron's 2024 MIK32 microcontroller is a replacement of STMicroelectronics' STM32L0, manufacturerd on its 0.18 μm (180 nm) process. The microcontroller implements a Synacore SCR1 RISC-V instruction set core. MIK32 is the first product to be packaged by Mikron itself.

== US sanctions ==
During the 1990s the Cold War era COCOM embargo was eased and in 2000-ties Russian chip manufacturing plants cooperated with US companies such as AMD in effort to obtain decommissioned past generation equipment needed to shorten the technological gap. In effort to curb these attempts, in 2012–2016 US government introduced sanctions against major Russian chip makers, Mikron included. Export of the US chip making equipment to Mikron became only available if duly licensed by the BIS. In April 2022, the US Treasury Department imposed blocking sanctions on 21 entities and 13 people, including Mikron, for their ties to Russia following Russia's invasion of Ukraine.

== Gallery ==
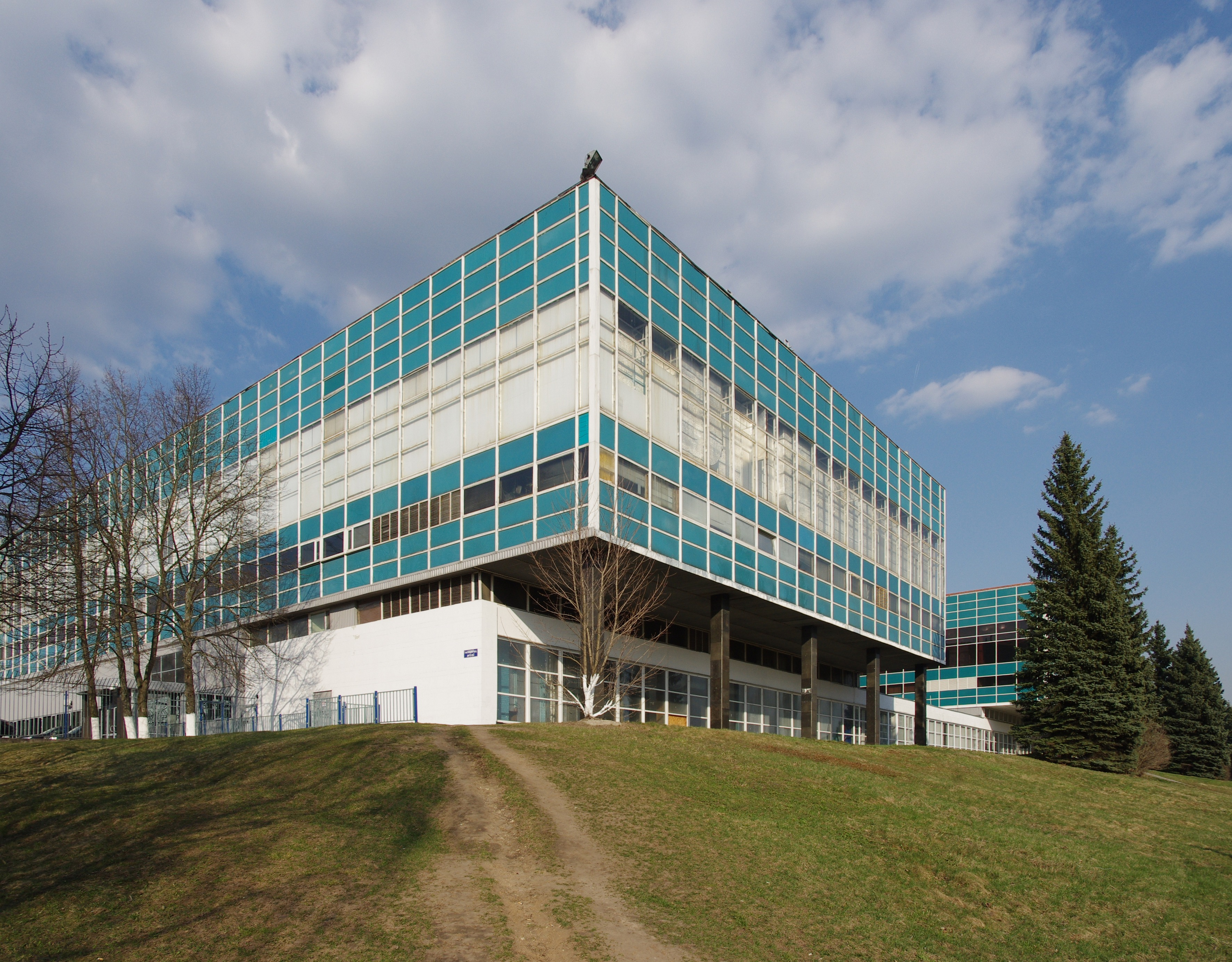
A Mikron engineering building

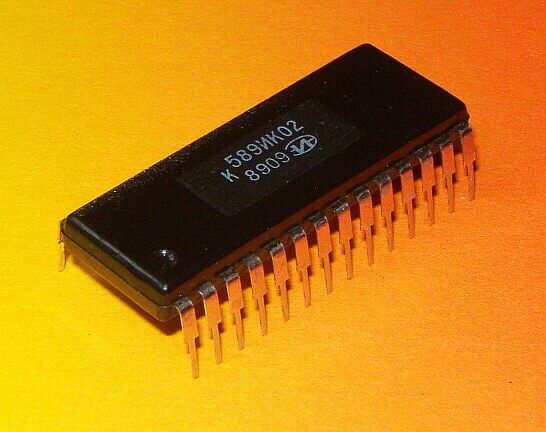
Bit-slice processor K589IK02, manufactured 1989

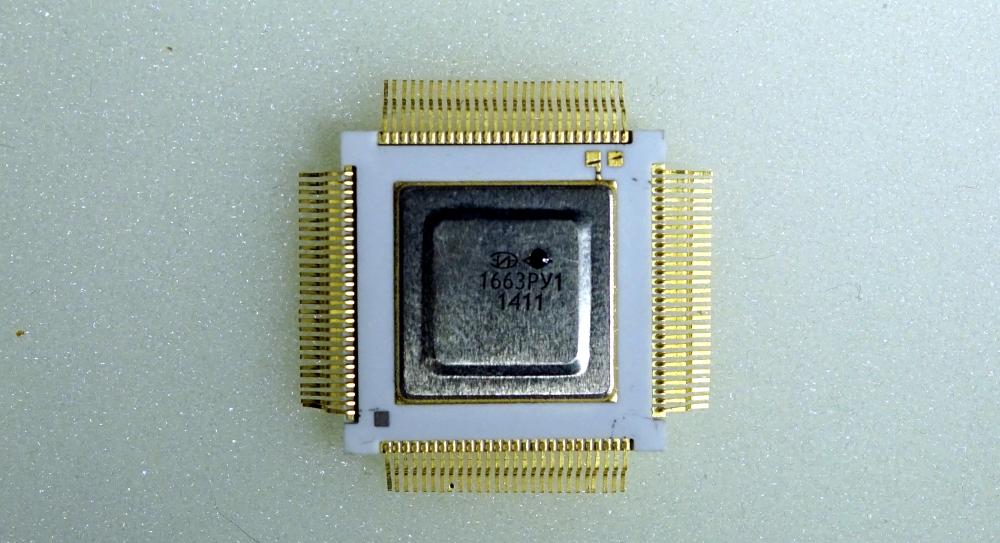
16Mbit SRAM 1663RU1, manufactured 2014

== See also ==
- Soviet integrated circuit designation
