= R6000 =

Microprocessor developed by MIPS Computer Systems

The R6000 is a microprocessor chip set developed by MIPS Computer Systems that implemented the MIPS II instruction set architecture (ISA). The chip set consisted of the R6000 microprocessor, R6010 floating-point unit and R6020 system bus controller. The R6000 was the first implementation of the MIPS II ISA.

The R6000 was implemented with emitter-coupled logic (ECL). In the mid- to late 1980s, the trend was to implement high-end microprocessors with high-speed logic such as ECL. As MIPS was a fabless company, the R6000 chip set was fabricated by Bipolar Integrated Technology (BIT) who had acted as a foundry for MIPS since November 1989. However, manufacturing issues that had caused "sporadic deliveries" of the R6000 to MIPS Computer Systems resulted in contractual restrictions being imposed on BIT, preventing the company from supplying other potential customers. Such issues, which had persisted for over a year, were reportedly resolved in 1991, enabling BIT to seek other customers for the product and, as part of its separate licensing agreement with MIPS, to be able to manufacture and sell customised versions of the chip.

The R6000 had few users. Control Data announced its high-end 4680 system featuring the processor and based on the MIPS RC6280 server in January 1990, indicating May 1990 availability, and 60 MHz versions of both systems were benchmarked in April 1990, indicating a performance lead over IBM's recently introduced RS/6000 models. MIPS used the R6000 in their RC6280 server, specifying a 66.7 MHz version of the processor, also specified for Control Data's 4680 system. MIPS also used the processor in their RC6260 server, announced in early 1991. One review of the RC6280 published in early 1991 described the product as "the single fastest system we have tested for CPU and FPU performance", enabling a "premium price" to be charged, with such pricing starting from $150,000 for the base configuration. However, delivery times for certain models were estimated at "several months" due to supply uncertainties with the processor.

Prime Computer introduced the R6000 in its EXL 7680 model. Bull also introduced the R6000 in its top-end DPX/2 510 models. Bull's machines were reportedly available from August 1990 onwards, using parts running at 60 MHz. Digital Equipment Corporation planned to use the R6000 in its DECstation range, but abandoned such plans due to the production volume issues with the part, electing to "concentrate on CMOS chips" such as the R4000 instead. Silicon Graphics passed over the R6000 entirely in favour of the R4000.

Control Data Systems, spun out from Control Data in 1992, announced plans to develop a "higher performance, higher clock-speed implementation" of the R6000 in association with NEC. These were accompanied by plans to support R4000 processors in its 4860 systems.
