= MIPS architecture =

Instruction set architecture

MIPS
- Designer: MIPS Technologies, Imagination Technologies
- Bits: 64-bit (32 → 64)
- Introduced: 1985; 41 years ago
- Version: MIPS32/64 Release 6 (2014)
- Design: RISC
- Type: Load–store
- Encoding: Fixed
- Branching: Compare and branch, with a 1 instruction delay after the branching condition check
- Endianness: Bi
- Page size: 4 KB
- Extensions: MDMX, MIPS-3D
- Open: Partly. The R16000 processor has been on the market for more than 20 years and as such cannot be subject to patent claims. Therefore, the R16000 and older processors are fully open.

Registers
- General-purpose: 32
- Floating-point: 32

MIPS (Microprocessor without Interlocked Pipelined Stages) is a family of reduced instruction set computer (RISC) instruction set architectures (ISA) developed by MIPS Computer Systems, now MIPS Technologies, based in the United States.

There are multiple versions of MIPS, including MIPS I, II, III, IV, and V, as well as five releases of MIPS32/64 (for 32- and 64-bit implementations, respectively). The early MIPS architectures were 32-bit; 64-bit versions were developed later. As of April 2017, the current version of MIPS is MIPS32/64 Release 6. MIPS32/64 primarily differs from MIPS I–V by defining the privileged kernel mode System Control Coprocessor in addition to the user mode architecture.

The MIPS architecture has several optional extensions: MIPS-3D, a simple set of floating-point SIMD instructions dedicated to 3D computer graphics; MDMX (MaDMaX), a more extensive integer SIMD instruction set using 64-bit floating-point registers; MIPS16e, which adds compression to the instruction stream to reduce the memory programs require; and MIPS MT, which adds multithreading capability.

Computer architecture courses in universities and technical schools often study the MIPS architecture. The architecture greatly influenced later RISC architectures such as Alpha. In March 2021, MIPS announced that the development of the MIPS architecture had ended as the company is making the transition to RISC-V.

== History ==
The first version of the MIPS architecture was designed by MIPS Computer Systems for its R2000 microprocessor, the first MIPS implementation. Both MIPS and the R2000 were introduced together in 1985. When MIPS II was introduced, MIPS was renamed MIPS I to distinguish it from the new version.

MIPS Computer Systems' R6000 microprocessor (1989) was the first MIPS II implementation. Designed for servers, the R6000 was fabricated and sold by Bipolar Integrated Technology, but was a commercial failure. During the mid-1990s, many new 32-bit MIPS processors for embedded systems were MIPS II implementations because the introduction of the 64-bit MIPS III architecture in 1991 left MIPS II as the newest 32-bit MIPS architecture until MIPS32 was introduced in 1999.

MIPS Computer Systems' R4000 microprocessor (1991) was the first MIPS III implementation. It was designed for use in personal, workstation, and server computers. MIPS Computer Systems aggressively promoted the MIPS architecture and R4000, establishing the Advanced Computing Environment (ACE) consortium to advance its Advanced RISC Computing (ARC) standard, which aimed to establish MIPS as the dominant personal computing platform. ARC found little success in personal computers, but the R4000 (and the R4400 derivative) were widely used in workstation and server computers, especially by its largest user, Silicon Graphics. Other uses of the R4000 included high-end embedded systems and supercomputers. MIPS III was eventually implemented by a number of embedded microprocessors. Quantum Effect Design's R4600 (1993) and its derivatives were widely used in high-end embedded systems and low-end workstations and servers. MIPS Technologies' R4200 (1994), was designed for embedded systems, laptop, and personal computers. A derivative, the R4300i, fabricated by NEC Electronics, was used in the Nintendo 64 game console. The Nintendo 64, along with the PlayStation, were among the highest volume users of MIPS architecture processors in the mid-1990s.

The first MIPS IV implementation was the MIPS Technologies R8000 microprocessor chipset (1994). The design of the R8000 began at Silicon Graphics, Inc. and it was only used in high-end workstations and servers for scientific and technical applications where high performance on large floating-point workloads was important. Later implementations were the MIPS Technologies R10000 (1996) and the Quantum Effect Devices R5000 (1996) and RM7000 (1998). The R10000, fabricated and sold by NEC Electronics and Toshiba, and its derivatives were used by NEC, Pyramid Technology, Silicon Graphics, and Tandem Computers (among others) in workstations, servers, and supercomputers. The R5000 and R7000 found use in high-end embedded systems, personal computers, and low-end workstations and servers. A derivative of the R5000 from Toshiba, the R5900, was used in Sony Computer Entertainment's Emotion Engine, which powered its PlayStation 2 game console.

Announced on October 21, 1996, at the Microprocessor Forum 1996 alongside the MIPS Digital Media Extensions (MDMX) extension, MIPS V was designed to improve the performance of 3D graphics transformations. In the mid-1990s, a major use of non-embedded MIPS microprocessors were graphics workstations from Silicon Graphics. MIPS V was completed by the integer-only MDMX extension to provide a complete system for improving the performance of 3D graphics applications. MIPS V implementations were never introduced. On May 12, 1997, Silicon Graphics announced the H1 ("Beast") and H2 ("Capitan") microprocessors. The former was to have been the first MIPS V implementation, and was due to be introduced in the first half of 1999. The H1 and H2 projects were later combined and eventually canceled in 1998. While there have not been any MIPS V implementations, MIPS64 Release 1 (1999) was based on MIPS V and retains all of its features as an optional Coprocessor 1 (FPU) feature called Paired-Single.

When MIPS Technologies was spun-out of Silicon Graphics in 1998, it refocused on the embedded market. Through MIPS V, each successive version was a strict superset of the previous version, but this property was found to be a problem, and the architecture definition was changed to define a 32-bit and a 64-bit architecture: MIPS32 and MIPS64. Both were introduced in 1999. MIPS32 is based on MIPS II with some additional features from MIPS III, MIPS IV, and MIPS V; MIPS64 is based on MIPS V. NEC, Toshiba and SiByte (later acquired by Broadcom) each obtained licenses for MIPS64 as soon as it was announced. Philips, LSI Logic, IDT, Raza Microelectronics, Inc., Cavium, Loongson Technology and Ingenic Semiconductor have since joined them. MIPS32/MIPS64 Release 5 was announced on December 6, 2012. According to the Product Marketing Director at MIPS, Release 4 was skipped because the number four is perceived as unlucky in many Asian cultures.

In December 2018, Wave Computing, the new owner of the MIPS architecture, announced that MIPS ISA would be open-sourced in a program dubbed the MIPS Open initiative. The program was intended to open up access to the most recent versions of both the 32-bit and 64-bit designs making them available without any licensing or royalty fees as well as granting participants licenses to existing MIPS patents.

In March 2019, MIPS Revision 6 was made available under a royalty-free license, but later that year the program was shut down again.

In March 2021, Wave Computing announced that the development of the MIPS architecture has ceased. The company has joined the RISC-V foundation and future processor designs will be based on the RISC-V architecture. In spite of this, some licensees such as Loongson are continuing with new extensions of MIPS-compatible ISAs on their own.

In January 2024, Loongson won a case over rights to use MIPS architecture.

== Design ==
MIPS is a modular architecture supporting up to four coprocessors (COP0/1/2/3). In MIPS terminology, COP0 is the System Control Coprocessor (an essential part of the processor that is implementation-defined in MIPS I–V), COP1 is an optional floating-point unit (FPU), and COP2 and COP3 are optional implementation-defined coprocessors (MIPS III removed COP3 and reused its opcodes for other purposes). For example, in the PlayStation video game console, COP2 is the Geometry Transformation Engine (GTE), which accelerates the processing of geometry in 3D computer graphics.

== Versions ==
=== MIPS I ===
MIPS is a load/store architecture (also known as a register-register architecture); except for the load/store instructions used to access memory, all instructions operate on the registers.

MIPS I has thirty-two 32-bit general-purpose registers (GPR). Register $0 is hardwired to zero and writes to it are discarded. Register $31 is the link register. For integer multiplication and division instructions, which run asynchronously from other instructions, a pair of 32-bit registers, HI and LO, are provided. There is a small set of instructions for copying data between the general-purpose registers and the HI/LO registers. The program counter has 32 bits. The two low-order bits always contain zero since MIPS I instructions are 32 bits long and are aligned to their natural word boundaries.

Instructions are divided into three types: R (register), I (immediate), and J (jump). Every instruction starts with a 6-bit opcode. In addition to the opcode, R-type instructions specify three registers, a shift amount field, and a function field; I-type instructions specify two registers and a 16-bit immediate value; J-type instructions follow the opcode with a 26-bit jump target.

The following are the three formats used for the core instruction set:

Type	-31- format (bits) -0-					
R	opcode (6)	rs (5)	rt (5)	rd (5)	shamt (5)	funct (6)
I	opcode (6)	rs (5)	rt (5)	immediate (16)		
J	opcode (6)	address (26)				

MIPS I has instructions that load and store 8-bit bytes, 16-bit halfwords, and 32-bit words. Only one addressing mode is supported: base + displacement. Since MIPS I is a 32-bit architecture, loading quantities fewer than 32 bits requires the datum to be either sign-extended or zero-extended to 32 bits. The load instructions suffixed by "unsigned" perform zero extension; otherwise sign extension is performed. Load instructions source the base from the contents of a GPR (rs) and write the result to another GPR (rt). Store instructions source the base from the contents of a GPR (rs) and the store data from another GPR (rt). All load and store instructions compute the memory address by summing the base with the sign-extended 16-bit immediate. MIPS I requires all memory accesses to be aligned to their natural word boundaries, otherwise an exception is signaled. To support efficient unaligned memory accesses, there are load/store word instructions suffixed by "left" or "right". All load instructions are followed by a load delay slot. The instruction in the load delay slot cannot use the data loaded by the load instruction. The load delay slot can be filled with an instruction that is not dependent on the load; a NOP is substituted if such an instruction cannot be found.

MIPS I has instructions to perform addition and subtraction. These instructions source their operands from two GPRs (rs and rt), and write the result to a third GPR (rd). Alternatively, addition can source one of the operands from a 16-bit immediate (which is sign-extended to 32 bits). The instructions for addition and subtraction have two variants: by default, an exception is signaled if the result overflows; instructions with the "unsigned" suffix do not signal an exception. The overflow check interprets the result as a 32-bit two's complement integer. MIPS I has instructions to perform bitwise logical AND, OR, XOR, and NOR. These instructions source their operands from two GPRs and write the result to a third GPR. The AND, OR, and XOR instructions can alternatively source one of the operands from a 16-bit immediate (which is zero-extended to 32 bits). The "Set on relation" instructions write one or zero to the destination register if the specified relation is true or false. These instructions source their operands from two GPRs or one GPR and a 16-bit immediate (which is sign-extended to 32 bits), and write the result to a third GPR. By default, the operands are interpreted as signed integers. The variants of these instructions that are suffixed with "unsigned" interpret the operands as unsigned integers (even those that source an operand from the sign-extended 16-bit immediate).

The Load Upper Immediate instruction copies the 16-bit immediate into the high-order 16 bits of a GPR. It is used in conjunction with the Or Immediate instruction to load a 32-bit immediate into a register.

MIPS I has instructions to perform left and right logical shifts and right arithmetic shifts. The operand is obtained from a GPR (rt), and the result is written to another GPR (rd). The shift distance is obtained from either a GPR (rs) or a 5-bit "shift amount" (the "sa" field).

MIPS I has instructions for signed and unsigned integer multiplication and division. These instructions source their operands from two GPRs and write their results to a pair of 32-bit registers called HI and LO, since they may execute separately from (and concurrently with) the other CPU instructions. For multiplication, the high- and low-order halves of the 64-bit product is written to HI and LO (respectively). For division, the quotient is written to LO and the remainder to HI. To access the results, a pair of instructions (Move from HI and Move from LO) is provided to copy the contents of HI or LO to a GPR. These instructions are interlocked: reads of HI and LO do not proceed past an unfinished arithmetic instruction that will write to HI and LO. Another pair of instructions (Move to HI or Move to LO) copies the contents of a GPR to HI and LO. These instructions are used to restore HI and LO to their original state after exception handling. Instructions that read HI or LO must be separated by two instructions that do not write to HI or LO.

All MIPS I control flow instructions are followed by a branch delay slot. Unless the branch delay slot is filled by an instruction performing useful work, a NOP is substituted. MIPS I branch instructions compare the contents of a GPR (rs) against zero or another GPR (rt) as signed integers and branch if the specified condition is true. Control is transferred to the address computed by shifting the 16-bit offset left by two bits, sign-extending the 18-bit result, and adding the 32-bit sign-extended result to the sum of the program counter (instruction address) and 8_{10}. Jumps have two versions: absolute and register-indirect. Absolute jumps ("Jump" and "Jump and Link") compute the address to which control is transferred by shifting the 26-bit instr_index left by two bits and concatenating the 28-bit result with the four high-order bits of the address of the instruction in the branch delay slot. Register-indirect jumps transfer control to the instruction at the address sourced from a GPR (rs). The address sourced from the GPR must be word-aligned, else an exception is signaled after the instruction in the branch delay slot is executed. Branch and jump instructions that link (except for "Jump and Link Register") save the return address to GPR 31. The "Jump and Link Register" instruction permits the return address to be saved to any writable GPR.

MIPS I has two instructions for software to signal an exception: System Call and Breakpoint. System Call is used by user mode software to make kernel calls; and Breakpoint is used to transfer control to a debugger via the kernel's exception handler. Both instructions have a 20-bit Code field that can contain operating environment-specific information for the exception handler.

MIPS has 32 floating-point registers. Two registers are paired for double precision numbers. Odd numbered registers cannot be used for arithmetic or branching, just as part of a double precision register pair, resulting in 16 usable registers for most instructions (moves/copies and loads/stores were not affected).

Single precision is denoted by the .s suffix, while double precision is denoted by the .d suffix.

=== MIPS II ===
MIPS II removed the load delay slot and added several sets of instructions. For shared-memory multiprocessing, the Synchronize Shared Memory, Load Linked Word, and Store Conditional Word instructions were added. A set of Trap-on-Condition instructions were added. These instructions caused an exception if the evaluated condition is true. All existing branch instructions were given branch-likely versions that executed the instruction in the branch delay slot only if the branch is taken. These instructions improve performance in certain cases by allowing useful instructions to fill the branch delay slot. Doubleword load and store instructions for COP1–3 were added. Consistent with other memory access instructions, these loads and stores required the doubleword to be naturally aligned.

The instruction set for the floating point coprocessor also had several instructions added to it. An IEEE 754-compliant floating-point square root instruction was added. It supported both single- and double-precision operands. A set of instructions that converted single- and double-precision floating-point numbers to 32-bit words were added. These complemented the existing conversion instructions by allowing the IEEE rounding mode to be specified by the instruction instead of the Floating Point Control and Status Register.

=== MIPS III ===
MIPS III is a backwards-compatible extension of MIPS II that added support for 64-bit memory addressing and integer operations. The 64-bit data type is called a doubleword, and MIPS III extended the general-purpose registers, HI/LO registers, and program counter to 64 bits to support it. New instructions were added to load and store doublewords, to perform integer addition, subtraction, multiplication, division, and shift operations on them, and to move doubleword between the GPRs and HI/LO registers. For shared-memory multiprocessing, the Load Linked Double Word, and Store Conditional Double Word instructions were added. Existing instructions originally defined to operate on 32-bit words were redefined, where necessary, to sign-extend the 32-bit results to permit words and doublewords to be treated identically by most instructions. Among those instructions redefined was Load Word. In MIPS III it sign-extends words to 64 bits. To complement Load Word, a version that zero-extends was added.

The R instruction format's inability to specify the full shift distance for 64-bit shifts (its 5-bit shift amount field is too narrow to specify the shift distance for doublewords) required MIPS III to provide three 64-bit versions of each MIPS I shift instruction. The first version is a 64-bit version of the original shift instructions, used to specify constant shift distances of 0–31 bits. The second version is similar to the first, but adds 32_{10} the shift amount field's value so that constant shift distances of 32–63 bits can be specified. The third version obtains the shift distance from the six low-order bits of a GPR.

MIPS III added a supervisor privilege level in between the existing kernel and user privilege levels. This feature only affected the implementation-defined System Control Processor (Coprocessor 0).

MIPS III removed the Coprocessor 3 (COP3) support instructions, and reused its opcodes for the new doubleword instructions. The remaining coprocessors gained instructions to move doublewords between coprocessor registers and the GPRs. The floating general registers (FGRs) were extended to 64 bits and the requirement for instructions to use even-numbered register only was removed. This is incompatible with earlier versions of the architecture; a bit in the floating-point control/status register is used to operate the MIPS III floating-point unit (FPU) in a MIPS I- and II-compatible mode. The floating-point control registers were not extended for compatibility. The only new floating-point instructions added were those to copy doublewords between the CPU and FPU convert single- and double-precision floating-point numbers into doubleword integers and vice versa.

=== MIPS IV ===
MIPS IV is the fourth version of the architecture. It is a superset of MIPS III and is compatible with all existing versions of MIPS. MIPS IV was designed to mainly improve floating-point (FP) performance. To improve access to operands, an indexed addressing mode (base + index, both sourced from GPRs) for FP loads and stores was added, as were prefetch instructions for performing memory prefetching and specifying cache hints (these supported both the base + offset and base + index addressing modes).

MIPS IV added several features to improve instruction-level parallelism. To alleviate the bottleneck caused by a single condition bit, seven condition code bits were added to the floating-point control and status register, bringing the total to eight. FP comparison and branch instructions were redefined so they could specify which condition bit was written or read (respectively); and the delay slot in between an FP branch that read the condition bit written to by a prior FP comparison was removed. Support for partial predication was added in the form of conditional move instructions for both GPRs and FPRs; and an implementation could choose between having precise or imprecise exceptions for IEEE 754 traps.

MIPS IV added several new FP arithmetic instructions for both single- and double-precision FPNs: fused-multiply add or subtract, reciprocal, and reciprocal square-root. The FP fused-multiply add or subtract instructions perform either one or two roundings (it is implementation-defined), to exceed or meet IEEE 754 accuracy requirements (respectively). The FP reciprocal and reciprocal square-root instructions do not comply with IEEE 754 accuracy requirements, and produce results that differ from the required accuracy by one or two units of last place (it is implementation defined). These instructions serve applications where instruction latency is more important than accuracy.

=== MIPS V ===
MIPS V added a new data type, the Paired Single (PS), which consisted of two single-precision (32-bit) floating-point numbers stored in the existing 64-bit floating-point registers. Variants of existing floating-point instructions for arithmetic, compare and conditional move were added to operate on this data type in a SIMD fashion. New instructions were added for loading, rearranging and converting PS data. It was the first instruction set to exploit floating-point SIMD with existing resources.

=== MIPS32/MIPS64 ===
The first release of MIPS32, based on MIPS II, added conditional moves, prefetch instructions, and other features from the R4000 and R5000 families of 64-bit processors. The first release of MIPS64 adds a MIPS32 mode to run 32-bit code. The MUL and MADD (multiply-add) instructions, previously available in some implementations, were added to the MIPS32 and MIPS64 specifications, as were cache control instructions. For the purpose of cache control, both SYNC and SYNCI instructions were prepared.

MIPS32/MIPS64 Release 6 in 2014 added the following:

- a new family of branches with no delay slot:
  - unconditional branches (BC) and branch-and-link (BALC) with a 26-bit offset,
  - conditional branch on zero/non-zero with a 21-bit offset,
  - full set of signed and unsigned conditional branches compare between two registers (e.g. BGTUC) or a register against zero (e.g. BGTZC),
  - full set of branch-and-link which compare a register against zero (e.g. BGTZALC).
- index jump instructions with no delay slot designed to support large absolute addresses.
- instructions to load 16-bit immediates at bit position 16, 32 or 48, allowing to easily generate large constants.
- PC-relative load instructions, as well as address generation with large (PC-relative) offsets.
- bit-reversal and byte-alignment instructions (previously only available with the DSP extension).
- multiply and divide instructions redefined so that they use a single register for their result).
- instructions generating truth values now generate all zeroes or all ones instead of just clearing/setting the 0-bit,
- instructions using a truth value now only interpret all-zeroes as false instead of just looking at the 0-bit.

Removed infrequently used instructions:

- some conditional moves
- branch likely instructions (deprecated in previous releases).
- integer overflow trapping instructions with 16-bit immediate
- integer accumulator instructions (together HI/LO registers, moved to the DSP Application-Specific Extension)
- unaligned load instructions (LWL and LWR), (requiring that most ordinary loads and stores support misaligned access, possibly via trapping and with the addition of a new instruction (BALIGN))

Reorganized the instruction encoding, freeing space for future expansions.

=== microMIPS ===
The microMIPS32/64 architectures are supersets of the MIPS32 and MIPS64 architectures (respectively) designed to replace the MIPS16e application-specific extension (ASE). A disadvantage of MIPS16e is that it requires a mode switch before any of its 16-bit instructions can be processed. microMIPS adds versions of the most-frequently used 32-bit instructions that are encoded as 16-bit instructions. This allows programs to intermix 16- and 32-bit instructions without having to switch modes. microMIPS was introduced alongside of MIPS32/64 Release 3, and each subsequent release of MIPS32/64 has a corresponding microMIPS32/64 version. A processor may implement microMIPS32/64 or both microMIPS32/64 and its corresponding MIPS32/64 subset. Starting with MIPS32/64 Release 6, support for MIPS16e ended, and microMIPS is the only form of code compression in MIPS.

== Application-specific extensions ==
The base MIPS32 and MIPS64 architectures can be supplemented with a number of optional architectural extensions, which are collectively referred to as application-specific extensions (ASEs). These ASEs provide features that improve the efficiency and performance of certain workloads, such as digital signal processing.

=== MIPS MCU ===
Enhancements for microcontroller applications. The MCU ASE (application-specific extension) has been developed to extend the interrupt controller support, reduce the interrupt latency and enhance the I/O peripheral control function typically required in microcontroller system designs.

- Separate priority and vector generation
- Supports up to 256 interrupts in EIC (External Interrupt Controller) mode and eight hardware interrupt pins
- Provides 16-bit vector offset address
- Pre-fetching of the interrupt exception vector
- Automated Interrupt Prologue – adds hardware to save and update system status before the interrupt handling routine
- Automated Interrupt Epilogue – restores the system state previously stored in the stack for returning from the interrupt.
- Interrupt Chaining – supports the service of pending interrupts without the need to exit the initial interrupt routine, saving the cycles required to store and restore multiple active interrupts
- Supports speculative pre-fetching of the interrupt vector address. Reduces the number of interrupt service cycles by overlapping memory accesses with pipeline flushes and exception prioritization
- Includes atomic bit set/clear instructions which enables bits within an I/O register that are normally used to monitor or control external peripheral functions to be modified without interruption, ensuring the action is performed securely.

=== MIPS16 ===
MIPS16 is an Application-Specific Extension for MIPS I through to V designed by LSI Logic and MIPS Technologies, announced on October 21, 1996, alongside its first implementation, the LSI Logic TinyRISC processor. MIPS16 was subsequently licensed by NEC Electronics, Philips Semiconductors, and Toshiba (among others); and implemented as an extension to the MIPS I, II, an III architectures. MIPS16 decreases the size of application by up to 40% by using 16-bit instructions instead of 32-bit instructions and also improves power efficiency, the instruction cache hit rate, and is equivalent in performance to its base architecture. It is supported by hardware and software development tools from MIPS Technologies and other providers. MIPS16e is an improved version of MIPS16 first supported by MIPS32 and MIPS64 Release 1. MIPS16e2 is an improved version of MIPS16 that is supported by MIPS32 and MIPS64 (up to Release 5). Release 6 replaced it with microMIPS.

=== MIPS Digital Signal Processing (DSP) ===
The DSP ASE is an optional extension to the MIPS32/MIPS64 Release 2 and newer instruction sets which can be used to accelerate a large range of "media" computations—particularly audio and video. The DSP module comprises a set of instructions and state in the integer pipeline and requires minimal additional logic to implement in MIPS processor cores. Revision 2 of the ASE was introduced in the second half of 2006. This revision adds extra instructions to the original ASE, but is otherwise backwards-compatible with it. Unlike the bulk of the MIPS architecture, it's a fairly irregular set of operations, many chosen for a particular relevance to some key algorithm. Its main novel features (vs original MIPS32):

- Saturating arithmetic (when a calculation overflows, deliver the representable number closest to the non-overflowed answer).
- Fixed-point arithmetic on signed 32- and 16-bit fixed-point fractions with a range of -1 to +1 (these are widely called "Q31" and "Q15").
- The existing integer multiplication and multiply-accumulate instructions, which deliver results into a double-size accumulator (called "hi/lo" and 64 bits on MIPS32 CPUs). The DSP ASE adds three more accumulators, and some different flavours of multiply-accumulate.
- SIMD instructions operating on 4 x unsigned bytes or 2 x 16-bit values packed into a 32-bit register (the 64-bit variant of the DSP ASE supports larger vectors, too).
- SIMD operations are basic arithmetic, shifts and some multiply-accumulate type operations.

=== MIPS SIMD architecture (MSA) ===
Instruction set extensions designed to accelerate multimedia.

- Predefined scalable extensions for chips with more gates/transistors
- 32 vector registers of 16 x 8-bit, 8 x 16-bit, 4 x 32-bit, and 2 x 64 bit vector elements, all 128-bit in width
- Includes operations for:
  - Efficient vector arithmetic on integer, fixed-point and floating-point data with full rounding and saturation options
  - Creating absolute values in vectors
  - Full precision multiplication and fused multiply-add
  - Conversions between integer, floating-point and fixed-point data
  - Vector-level comparison and branching without condition flags
  - Vector (1D) and array (2D) shuffling
  - Typed loads and stores for endian-independent operation
- IEEE 754-2008 compliant
- Element-precise floating-point exception signaling
- Accelerates compute-intensive applications by leveraging generic compiler support
- Created as a software-programmable solution for consumer electronics applications or functions not covered by dedicated hardware
- Created for emerging data mining, feature extraction, multimedia processing, GUIs and high-performance scientific computing

=== MIPS virtualization ===
MIPS Revision 6 added native virtualization supported by hardware.

=== MIPS multi-threading ===
Each multi-threaded MIPS core can support up to two VPEs (Virtual Processing Elements) which share a single pipeline as well as other hardware resources. However, since each VPE includes a complete copy of the processor state as seen by the software system, each VPE appears as a complete standalone processor to an SMP Linux operating system. For more fine-grained thread processing applications, each VPE is capable of supporting up to nine TCs allocated across two VPEs. The TCs share a common execution unit but each has its own program counter and core register files so that each can handle a thread from the software. The MIPS MT architecture also allows the allocation of processor cycles to threads, and sets the relative thread priorities with an optional Quality of Service (QoS) manager block. This enables two prioritization mechanisms that determine the flow of information across the bus. The first mechanism allows the user to prioritize one thread over another. The second mechanism is used to allocate a specified ratio of the cycles to specific threads over time. The combined use of both mechanisms allows effective allocation of bandwidth to the set of threads, and better control of latencies. In real-time systems, system-level determinism is very critical, and the QoS block facilitates improvement of the predictability of a system. Hardware designers of advanced systems may replace the standard QoS block provided by MIPS Technologies with one that is specifically tuned for their application.

=== SmartMIPS ===
SmartMIPS is an Application-Specific Extension (ASE) designed by Gemplus International and MIPS Technologies to improve performance and reduce memory consumption for smart card software. It is supported by MIPS32 only, since smart cards do not require the capabilities of MIPS64 processors. Few smart cards use SmartMIPS.

=== MIPS Digital Media eXtension (MDMX) ===
Multimedia application accelerations that were common in the 1990s on RISC and CISC systems.

=== MIPS-3D ===
MIPS-3D is an extension to MIPS V that added 13 new instructions for improving the performance of 3D graphics applications. The instructions improved performance by reducing the number of instructions required to implement four common 3D graphics operations: vertex transformation, clipping, transformation and lighting.

For vertex transformation:

- ADDR

For clipping:

- CABS
- BC1ANY2F
- BC1ANY2T
- BC1ANY4F
- BC1ANY4T

For perspective division and normalization:

- RECIP1
- RECIP2
- RSQRT1
- RSQRT2

== Calling conventions ==
MIPS has had several calling conventions, especially on the 32-bit platform.

The O32 ABI is the most commonly used ABI, owing to its status as the original System V ABI for MIPS. It is strictly stack-based, with only four registers ($a0-$a3) available to pass arguments. Space on the stack is reserved in case the callee needs to save its arguments, but the registers are not stored there by the caller. The return value is stored in register $v0; a second return value may be stored in $v1. The ABI took shape in 1990 and was last updated in 1994. This perceived slowness, along with an antiquated floating-point model with only 16 registers, has encouraged the proliferation of many other calling conventions. It is only defined for 32-bit MIPS, but GCC has created a 64-bit variation called O64.

For 64-bit, the N64 ABI by Silicon Graphics is most commonly used. The most important improvement is that eight registers are now available for argument passing; it also increases the number of floating-point registers to 32. There is also an ILP32 version called N32, which uses 32-bit pointers for smaller code, analogous to the x32 ABI. Both run under the 64-bit mode of the CPU. The N32 and N64 ABIs pass the first eight arguments to a function in the registers $a0-$a7; subsequent arguments are passed on the stack. The return value (or a pointer to it) is stored in $v0; a second return value may be stored in $v1. In both the N32 and N64 ABIs, all registers are considered to be 64-bits wide.

A few attempts have been made to replace O32 with a 32-bit ABI that resembles N32 more than O32. A 1995 conference came up with MIPS EABI, for which the 32-bit version was quite similar. EABI inspired MIPS Technologies to propose a more radical "NUBI" ABI additionally reuse argument registers for the return value. MIPS EABI is supported by GCC but not LLVM, and neither supports NUBI.

For all of O32 and N32/N64, the return address is stored in $ra ($31). This is automatically set with the use of the JAL (jump and link) or JALR (jump and link register) instructions. The function prologue of a (non-leaf) MIPS subroutine pushes the return address (in $ra) to the stack.

On both O32 and N32/N64, the stack grows downwards, but the N32/N64 ABIs require 64-bit alignment for all stack entries. The frame pointer ($30) is optional and in practice rarely used except when the stack allocation in a function is determined at runtime, for example, by calling alloca().

For N32 and N64, the return address is typically stored 8 bytes before the stack pointer, although this may be optional.

For the N32 and N64 ABIs, a function must preserve the $s0-$s7 registers, the global pointer ($gp or $28), the stack pointer ($sp or $29) and the frame pointer ($fp or $30). The O32 ABI is the same except the calling function is required to save the $gp register instead of the called function.

For multi-threaded code, the thread local storage pointer is typically stored in special hardware register $29 and is accessed by using the mfhw (move from hardware) instruction. At least one vendor is known to store this information in the $k0 register which is normally reserved for kernel use, but this is not standard.

The $k0 and $k1 registers ($26, $27) are reserved for kernel use and should not be used by applications since these registers can be changed at any time by the kernel due to interrupts, context switches or other events.

Registers for O32 calling convention
Name	Number	Use	Callee must preserve?
$zero	$0	constant 0	—N/a
$at	$1	assembler temporary	No
$v0–$v1	$2–$3	values for function returns and expression evaluation	No
$a0–$a3	$4–$7	function arguments	No
$t0–$t7	$8–$15	temporaries	No
$s0–$s7	$16–$23	saved temporaries	Yes
$t8–$t9	$24–$25	temporaries	No
$k0–$k1	$26–$27	reserved for OS kernel	—N/a
$gp	$28	global pointer	Yes (except PIC code)
$sp	$29	stack pointer	Yes
$fp	$30	frame pointer	Yes
$ra	$31	return address	—N/a

Registers for N32 and N64 calling conventions
Name	Number	Use	Callee must preserve?
$zero	$0	constant 0	—N/a
$at	$1	assembler temporary	No
$v0–$v1	$2–$3	values for function returns and expression evaluation	No
$a0–$a7	$4–$11	function arguments	No
$t4–$t7	$12–$15	temporaries	No
$s0–$s7	$16–$23	saved temporaries	Yes
$t8–$t9	$24–$25	temporaries	No
$k0–$k1	$26–$27	reserved for OS kernel	—N/a
$gp	$28	global pointer	Yes
$sp	$29	stack pointer	Yes
$s8	$30	frame pointer	Yes
$ra	$31	return address	—N/a

Registers that are preserved across a call are registers that (by convention) will not be changed by a system call or procedure (function) call. For example, $s-registers must be saved to the stack by a procedure that needs to use them, and $sp and $fp are always incremented by constants, and decremented back after the procedure is done with them (and the memory they point to). By contrast, $ra is changed automatically by any normal function call (ones that use jal), and $t-registers must be saved by the program before any procedure call (if the program needs the values inside them after the call).

The userspace calling convention of position-independent code on Linux additionally requires that when a function is called the $t9 register must contain the address of that function. This convention dates back to the System V ABI supplement for MIPS.

== Uses ==
MIPS processors are used in embedded systems such as residential gateways and routers. Originally, MIPS was designed for general-purpose computing. During the 1980s and 1990s, MIPS processors for personal, workstation, and server computers were used by many companies such as Digital Equipment Corporation, MIPS Computer Systems, NEC, Pyramid Technology, SiCortex, Siemens Nixdorf, Silicon Graphics, and Tandem Computers.

Historically, video game consoles such as the Nintendo 64, Sony PlayStation, PlayStation 2, and PlayStation Portable used MIPS processors. MIPS processors also used to be popular in supercomputers during the 1990s, but all such systems have dropped off the TOP500 list. These uses were complemented by embedded applications at first, but during the 1990s, MIPS became a major presence in the embedded processor market, and by the 2000s, most MIPS processors were for these applications.

In the mid- to late-1990s, it was estimated that one in three RISC microprocessors produced was a MIPS processor.

By the late 2010s, MIPS machines were still commonly used in embedded markets, including automotive, wireless router, LTE modems (mainly via MediaTek), and microcontrollers (for example the Microchip Technology PIC32M). They have mostly faded out of the personal, server, and application space.

=== Game consoles / Arcade system boards ===
- Atari Games - Atari Flagstaff, Phoenix, Seattle, Vegas, and Denver
- Midway Games - Midway Seattle, Vegas, and Atlantis
- Namco - Namco Gorgon up to System Super 23
- Nintendo - Nintendo 64
- SNK - Hyper Neo Geo 64
- Sony - PlayStation, PlayStation 2, PlayStation Portable

== Simulators ==
Open Virtual Platforms (OVP) includes the freely available for non-commercial use simulator OVPsim, a library of models of processors, peripherals and platforms, and APIs which enable users to develop their own models. The models in the library are open source, written in C, and include the MIPS 4K, 24K, 34K, 74K, 1004K, 1074K, M14K, microAptiv, interAptiv, proAptiv 32-bit cores and the MIPS 64-bit 5K range of cores. These models are created and maintained by Imperas and in partnership with MIPS Technologies have been tested and assigned the MIPS-Verified mark. Sample MIPS-based platforms include both bare metal environments and platforms for booting unmodified Linux binary images. These platforms–emulators are available as source or binaries and are fast, free for non-commercial usage, and are easy to use. OVPsim is developed and maintained by Imperas and is very fast (hundreds of million of instructions per second), and built to handle multicore homogeneous and heterogeneous architectures and systems.

SPIM is a freely available MIPS32 simulator for use in education. Its newest version is called QtSpim and uses the Qt UI framework.

EduMIPS64 is a GPL graphical cross-platform MIPS64 CPU simulator written in Java/Swing, it started as a port of WinMIPS64, another MIPS64 simulator, and supports a wide subset of the MIPS64 ISA and allows the user to graphically see what happens in the pipeline when an assembly program is run.

MARS is another GUI-based MIPS emulator designed for use in education, specifically for use with Hennessy's Computer Organization and Design. It is no longer maintained.

Saturn is a GUI-based MIPS IDE with an assembler called Titan. It started as a project by a student at the University of Toronto as a replacement for MARS, which is no longer maintained. Saturn is now used in courses at the University of Toronto, and is maintained by students and faculty.

WebMIPS is a browser-based MIPS simulator with visual representation of a generic, pipelined processor. This simulator is quite useful for register tracking during step by step execution.

QtMips provides a simple 5-stage pipeline visualization as well as cache principle visualization for basic computer architectures courses. It is available both as a web application and as a downloadable program for Windows, Linux, and macOS.

More advanced free emulators are available from the GXemul (formerly known as the mips64emul project) and QEMU projects. They emulate the various MIPS III and IV microprocessors in addition to entire computer systems which use them.

Commercial simulators are available especially for the embedded use of MIPS processors, for example Wind River Simics (MIPS 4Kc and 5Kc, PMC RM9000, QED RM7000, Broadcom/Netlogic ec4400, Cavium Octeon I), Imperas (all MIPS32 and MIPS64 cores), VaST Systems (R3000, R4000), and CoWare (the MIPS4KE, MIPS24K, MIPS25Kf and MIPS34K).

CREATOR is an open-source, web-based integrated development environment (IDE) designed to be intuitive, cross-platform, generic, and compatible with real hardware devices. This IDE allows users to edit, assemble, debug, simulate, and run programs written in assembly languages such as MIPS32, RISC-V, Z80, etc., all within a single tool. In addition, it also allows these programs to be run on real hardware, such as microcontrollers (ESP32-C3, ESP32-C6, etc.) and SBC boards (OrangePi RV2, Nezha D1-H, etc.).

WepSIM is a browser-based simulator where a subset of MIPS instructions are micro-programmed. This simulator is very useful in order to learn how a CPU works at microprogramming level, at MIPS assembly level, with interruptions, etc.)

== See also ==
- DLX
- List of MIPS architecture processors
- MIPS architecture processors
- Pipeline (computing)
- Prpl Foundation
