= Quantum Effect Devices =

Microprocessor design company

Quantum Effect Devices, Inc.
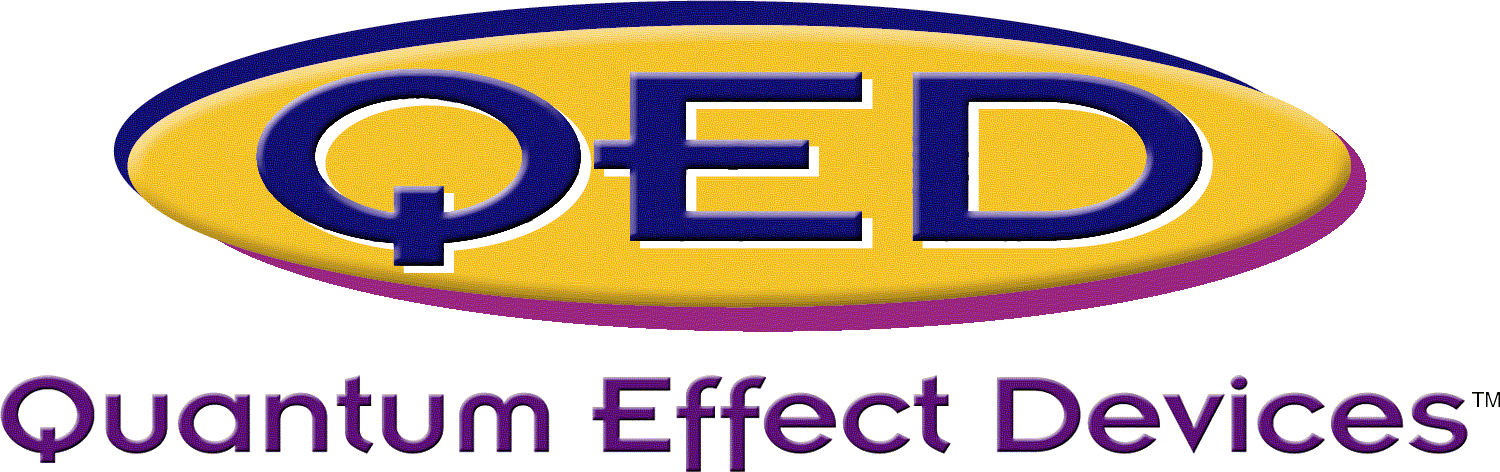
- Formerly: Quantum Effect Design, Inc.
- Company type: Private
- Industry: Semiconductor
- Founded: 1991; 35 years ago in Palo Alto, California
- Founders: Tom Riordan; Earl Killian; Ray Kunita
- Defunct: October 2000; 25 years ago
- Fate: Acquired by PMC-Sierra
- Products: Microprocessors

Quantum Effect Devices, Inc. (QED), was a microprocessor design company incorporated in 1991 as Quantum Effect Design. It was based in Palo Alto, California.

== History ==
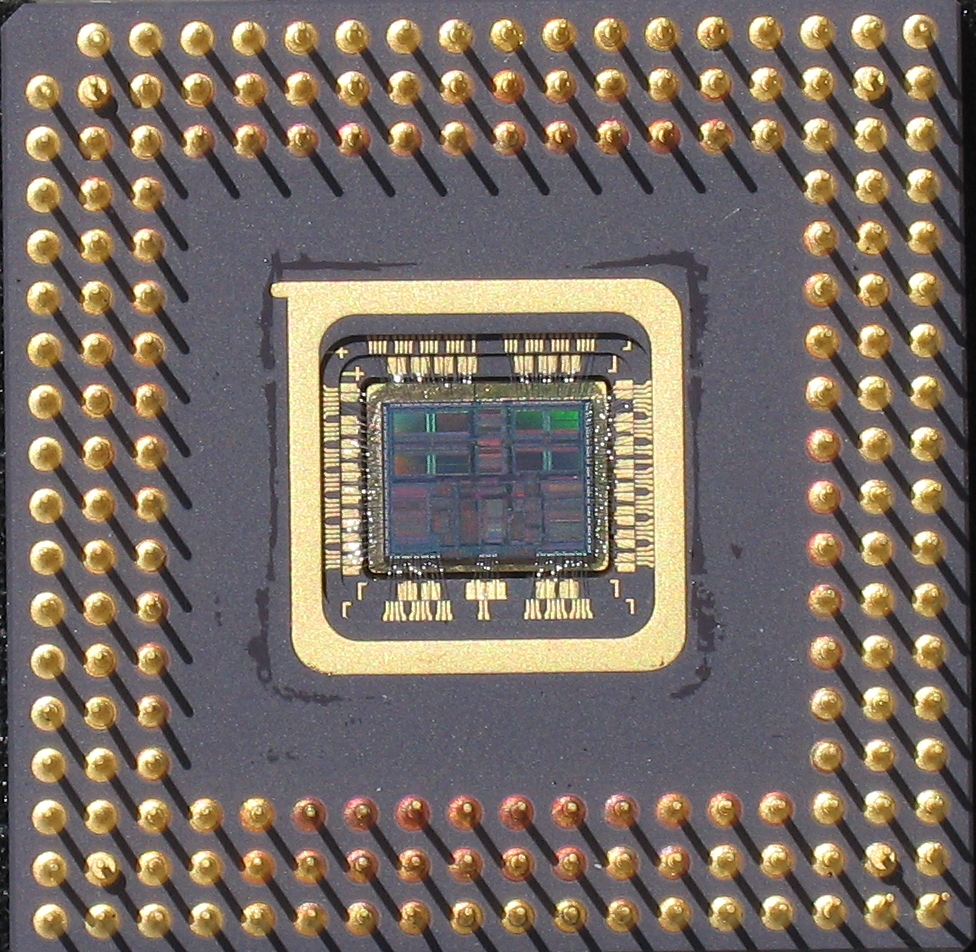
Underside view of IDT R4700 package with the die exposed

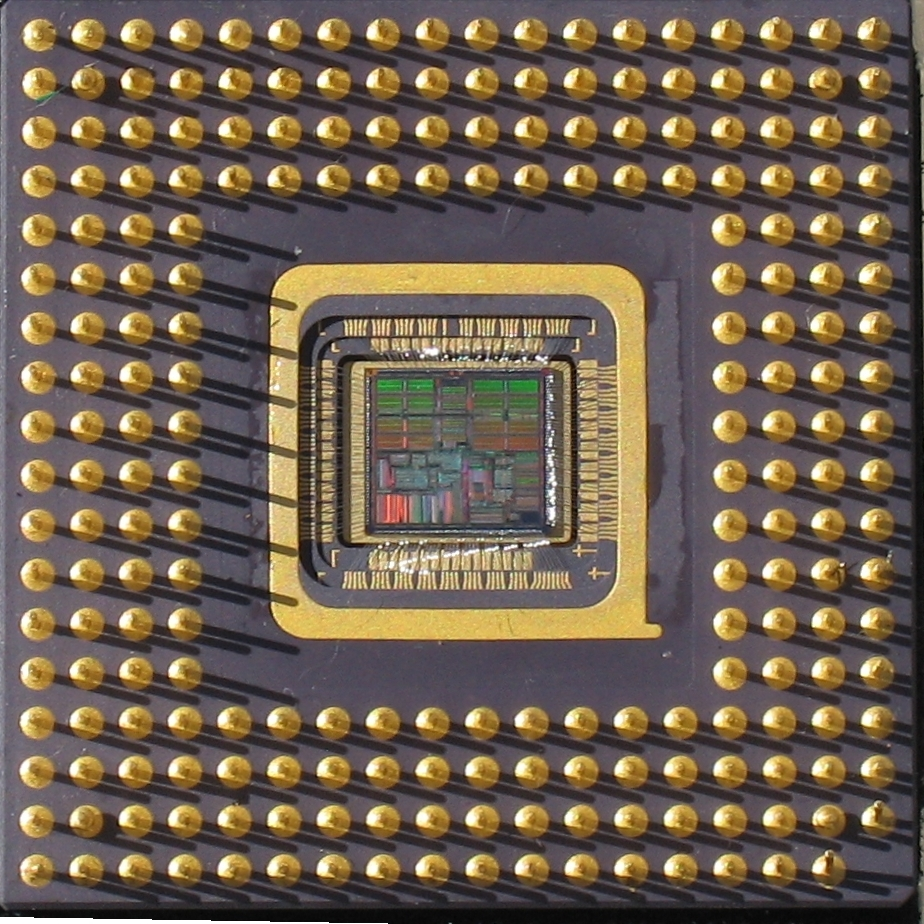
Underside view of QED RM5230 package with the die exposed

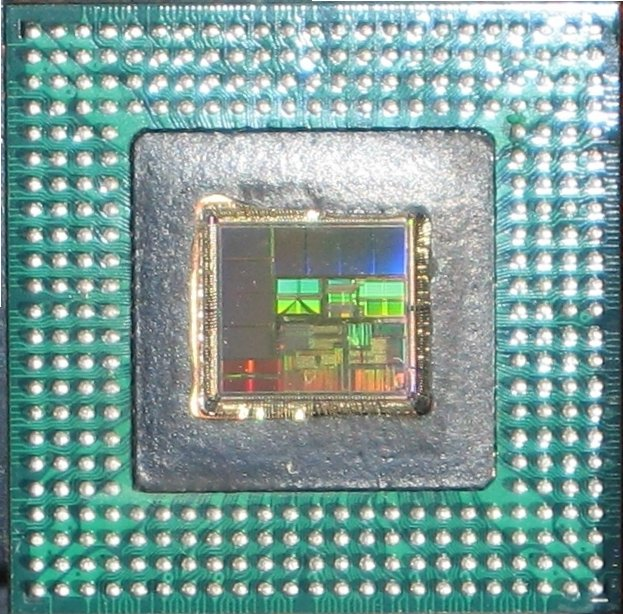
Underside view of QED RM7000 package with the die exposed

The three founders, Tom Riordan, Earl Killian and Ray Kunita, were senior managers at MIPS Computer Systems Inc. They left MIPS at a time when the company was having a difficult time selling entire computer systems (MIPS Magnum) instead of concentrating on building microprocessor chips which was MIPS' original mission. Soon after, SGI purchased MIPS. IDT was a major funder and customer for the initial QED design.

=== Business ===
The original product plan for QED was to build a MIPS microprocessor for a laptop computer. This was during the ACE initiative from Microsoft to support multiple RISC architectures for its new Windows NT operating system. System companies like DeskStation Technology and board companies like ShaBLAMM! Computer were building products in the hope that RISC-based personal computers would become mainstream. While that market never materialized, the first product, the R4600 "Orion" microprocessor, proved to be successful in several embedded markets such as networking routers and arcade games. Subsequent projects were designed for companies such as Toshiba and IDT (R4700), IDT & NKK (R4650), SGI and NEC (R5000).

The PowerPC 603q was a PowerPC microprocessor designed for Motorola, meant for Apple Computer's home PC and game machine designs. Neither of these designs were productized, so the PowerPC 603q never reached full production.

Several years later, in an attempt to increase product revenue, the company transformed itself to a product company selling its own line of MIPS microprocessors. At that time, the company changed its name to Quantum Effect Devices. After successful products introductions like the RM5200 and the RM7000, under its own "RISCMark" label, the company had its IPO on 1 February 2000. The initial stock price of $16 jumped to $56.50 on the first day of trading. The company was acquired by PMC-Sierra in October 2000; at the time, Quantum Effect Devices was valued in a stock swap worth $2.3 billion according to one estimate. The company became the Microprocessor Products Division of PMC. The acquisition was done by stock exchange and was valued at $2.3 billion. The team completed the RM9x00 product line while at PMC, but that product line was not successful in the marketplace. Most of the microprocessor core development team derived from QED was laid off as a group by PMC-Sierra in June 2005; the last few were laid off in January 2006.

The company name was attributed to Tom Riordan. He believed that the company would survive to the age when semiconductor geometry dimensions would become so small that quantum effects would dominate circuit behavior.

=== Devices ===
The first QED microprocessor was the R4600. The founders of QED, who were previously involved with the R4000, felt that the large device was too complicated and that a simpler implementation would give a better price/performance ratio. For that reason, the R4600 is a re-implementation of the 5-stage Classic RISC pipeline with large (for the time) caches. For a while, this small and low cost device was one of the highest performance microprocessors on the market. While the initial target market of a MIPS laptop computer never materialized, this device found success in several markets. It was the first RISC processor used within a Cisco Systems network router. It was used in several Atari/Midway arcade games such as the first two Killer Instinct games. The R4600 was licensed by IDT and Toshiba who manufactured and sold the devices.

The R4700 was targeted at SGI, who wanted a little more floating point performance. The R4700 improved on the repeat rate of floating point multiply instructions. This device was used inside the SGI Indy low-end workstation. The R4700 was licensed by IDT and Toshiba who manufactured and sold the devices.

The R4650 was commissioned by NKK, who desired a cheaper implementation for a video console game machine. The R4650 achieved a smaller die area by cutting the caches in half, only implementing single precision floating-point. This device was the first QED device that implemented the multiply–accumulate instructions, which enabled software functions such as softmodem. This device was used in the original Microsoft WebTV device. The R4650 was licensed by IDT and NKK who manufactured and sold the devices. The R4640 was the same chip but with the system bus restricted to 32-bits instead of 64-bits.

The R5000 was commissioned by SGI. This device doubled the instruction and data caches to 32 KB. It implemented a high-performance, fully pipelined floating point unit with multiply–accumulate capability and a SRT divider. The device had a limited implementation of superscalar instruction issue in which one integer instruction and one floating-point instruction could be issued in one cycle. This device was used in the SGI O2 and SGI Indy low-end workstations. The design was owned by SGI, which licensed the design to IDT and NEC and eventually to Toshiba.

The PowerPC 603q was commissioned by Motorola and the target market was Apple Computer's low-cost accounts including a home computer for students and a home video console game named Pippen. The 603q was basically the R4600 pipeline re-targeted for the PowerPC instruction set. Since the PowerPC 603 was then the most power-efficient chip from the AIM alliance, the name of this device was chosen to reflect its low-cost and low-power characteristics. Once those Apple projects were cancelled, Motorola stopped the development of the 603q even though QED had received first silicon samples and they were functional.

The RM52XX series was the first product line sold directly by QED. The first of the series was a cost-reduced version of the R5000 with smaller caches and a different pin-out. The earlier RM52X0 devices had only 16 KB caches while the later RM52X1 devices had 32 KB caches. The RM523X devices had 32-bit system buses while RM526X had 64-bit system buses. This product line was very successful in the laser printer market, winning many accounts at printer companies such as Hewlett-Packard, Lexmark, Ricoh, Samsung.

The RM70XX series was the second product line sold directly by QED. It implemented a large 256 KB on-chip level 2 cache. The RM7000 was one of the first microprocessors to do so, especially within the embedded microprocessor market segment. It also implemented symmetric superscalar instruction issue with two integer execution units. The RM7061 device was a pin-compatible upgrade for the RM526X series. This product line was a very successful follow-on to the RM52XX products.

The RM9x00 family was the first SOC implemented by QED. The Apollo microprocessor core that was part of the RM9x00 had its pipeline lengthened to 7 stages to enable higher operating frequencies. Dynamic branch prediction was added to ameliorate the longer branch latencies. Within the RM9x00, two Apollo cores were used to implement a dual-core device. These processor cores successfully achieved their operating frequency target of 1 GHz. The SOC system interconnect was an in-house design with centralized storage for the transactions flowing through the SOC. Peripherals included a DDR memory controller, a SysAD bus controller, a boot bus controller, a DMA controller and a Hypertransport controller. A second generation device added a Gigabit Ethernet controller, a PCI controller and cache coherency. This product family was not successful due to being late to the market. The company was financially conservative during the time leading up to and after the company's initial public offering and would not fully staff the SOC project. One of the reasons for selling the company to PMC-Sierra was to fund these SOC projects. By that time, competitors like SiByte had already entered the market with equivalent devices.

== See also ==
- Exponential Technology
