= Jazz (computer) =

Computer architecture

The Jazz computer architecture is a motherboard and chipset design originally developed by Microsoft for use in developing Windows NT. The design was eventually used as the basis for most MIPS-based Windows NT systems.

Microsoft intended NT to be portable between various microprocessor architectures so the MIPS RISC architecture was chosen for one of the first development platforms for the NT project in the late 1980s/early 1990s. However, around 1990, the existing MIPS-based systems (such as the TURBOchannel-equipped DECstation or the SGI Indigo) varied drastically from standard Intel personal computers such as the IBM AT—for example, neither used the ISA bus so common in Intel 386-class machines.

Microsoft decided to design their own MIPS-based hardware platform on which to develop NT, which resulted in the Jazz architecture. Later, Microsoft sold this architecture design to MIPS Computer Systems, Inc. where it became the MIPS Magnum.

== Architecture ==
The Jazz systems were designed to partially comply with the Advanced RISC Computing (ARC) standard, and each used the ARC firmware to boot Windows NT. Other operating systems were also ported to various Jazz implementations, such as RISC/os to the MIPS Magnum.

The Jazz architecture includes:

- a MIPS R4000/R4400 or compatible microprocessor
- an EISA bus
- a framebuffer for video output (the G364 framebuffer)
- PS/2 connectors for mouse and keyboard
- a floppy-disk controller
- onboard 16-bit sound system
- onboard National Semiconductor SONIC Ethernet
- onboard NCR 53C9x SCSI chipset for hard disk and CD-ROM interface
- standard IBM AT serial and parallel ports
- IBM AT-style time-of-year clock

== Systems ==
This design was simple enough and powerful enough that a majority of Windows NT-capable MIPS systems were based on modified versions of the Jazz architecture. Systems which were based on Jazz include the MIPS Magnum (R4000 PC-50 and SC-50 versions); Acer PICA, which uses S3 videocard; Olivetti M700, which has different video and sound system; and the NEC RISCstation, which is Jazz with PCI.

There were also some MIPS systems designed to run Windows NT and comply with the ARC standard, but nevertheless were not based on the Jazz platform, such as the DeskStation Tyne, NeTpower FASTseries Falcon, ShaBLAMM! NiTro-VLB, as well as the Siemens-Nixdorf RM-200, RM-300 and RM-400.
