= ShaBLAMM! NiTro-VLB =

The ShaBLAMM! NiTro-VLB was a computer system that used a QED R4600 microprocessor implemented on a VESA Local Bus peripheral card and designed to function when connected to a host computer system using an Intel i486. The NiTro-VLB conformed to the ARC standard, and was produced and marketed by ShaBLAMM! Computer as an "upgrade" card for accelerating Windows NT.

== Characteristics ==
The NiTro-VLB is notable for various unique characteristics among personal computer accessories. For example, although the system was marketed as an "upgrade" for computers already using a 486 processor, the NiTro-VLB was in fact of an entirely different architecture (specifically, the MIPS architecture) from the IA32-based 486. Further, as a "parasitic" or "symbiotic" coprocessor, the NiTro-VLB was designed to co-opt the host 486 processor from running, and used four megabytes of the host 486 motherboard's system memory as a DMA buffer (although the NiTro-VLB required its own separate DRAM main memory, in addition to any memory installed on the host 486 motherboard).

This is a type of "parasite"/"host" upgrade card configuration, in which an entire motherboard and processor are implemented on an expansion card designed to connect to a host motherboard's expansion slot. Such configurations are rare among computer systems designed to run Microsoft Windows.

== Specifications and benchmarks ==
The NiTro-VLB's QED R4600 processor, running at 100 MHz, was rated at 73.8 SPECint92 and 63 SPECfp92 (which are similar figures to the first-generation Pentium running at 66 MHz). Faster and costlier versions were designed to run at 133 MHz or 150 MHz.

== Sales ==
Initially, the NiTro-VLB system was priced at $1,095 for a 100 MHz card with no main memory, $1,995 for a 100 MHz card with 16 MB of main memory and a copy of Windows NT, and $2,595 for a 150 MHz card.

== See also ==
- DeskStation Tyne
- Jazz (computer)
- MIPS Magnum
