= Chris Rowen =

American entrepreneur (born 1957)

Chris Rowen is an American entrepreneur and technologist. Rowen is one of the founders of MIPS Computer Systems, Inc in 1984, of Tensilica Inc. in 1997 and of Babblelabs, Inc in 2017. Rowen was named Fellow of the Institute of Electrical and Electronics Engineers (IEEE) in 2016 for leadership in the development of microprocessors and reduced instruction set computers.

== Private life ==
Rowen was raised in Los Angeles, California, Washington D.C. and Atherton, California as one of six children. His father, Henry Rowen, was a national security expert, economist and academician. His mother, Beverly Griffiths Rowen, was trained as a chemist, and later worked as a technical writer, academic manager and policy advisor. He attended public schools, attended Harvard University and graduated with a bachelor's in physics. He later went to Stanford University to earn his master's degree and PhD in electrical engineering in 1985. He married Anne Baker in 1982, and has three daughters. He lives in Santa Cruz, California.

== Career ==
Rowen worked first as a summer intern in 1977, then as a new college graduate for Intel Corporation, starting in 1978, specifically on random access memory products. He returned to studies in 1980, while continuing to work part-time at Intel's Santa Cruz facilities, where he met his wife, Anne Baker. His research work reduced instruction set computers, called the Stanford MIPS project, along with advisor John L. Hennessy, and fellow students, Thomas Gross, Steve Przybylski, Norman Jouppi and others, eventually led to the founding of MIPS in 1984. At MIPS he worked on the MIPS instruction set, design tools, and verification of the MIPS R2000 and R3000 processors. He also led development of several generation of small UNIX workstations and servers and eventually led microprocessor research as Vice President of Microprocessor Design during the development of MIPS R4000, R4200 and R10000 processors. MIPS was acquired by Silicon Graphics Inc. in 1992, where Rowen served as Director of Core Technologies for Europe, based in Neucahtel Switzerland.

After returning from Switzerland in 1996, he worked for one year as vice president and general manager of design reuse for Synopsys, Inc. before leaving to focus on new ideas on for processors designs. He founded Tensilica in July 1997, and soon teamed up with Bernie Rosenthal and Harvey Jones, to develop the idea of automatic creation of application-specific instruction set processors as licensable designs with complementary software development environments. Other senior founders included Beatrice Fu, Keith Van Sickle, Monica Lam, Earl Killian, Rene Haas and Dror Maydan. Rowen served as CEO of Tensilica until 2008, and then as CTO until Tensilica acquisition by Cadence Design Systems Inc. At Cadence, Rowen was CTO for the Intellectual Property Group.

Rowen shifted his focus back to entrepreneurship starting in 2016, calling his investment effort Cognite Ventures, LLC, an effort to invest in, advise and analyze start-ups in the deep learning domain. He also served as senior advisor to the SystemX Alliance industrial affiliates program at Stanford University for 2017. In October 2017, he cofounded BabbleLabs, Inc, a startup applying deep learning methods to speech processing.

BabbleLabs developed new speech enhancement and speech recognition methods, for deployment both in edge devices and cloud services. The role of improved voice communication became particularly crucial with the rise in work-from-home in 2020 triggered by the COVID-19 pandemic. BabbleLabs was acquired by Cisco Systems in October 2020, and the BabbleLabs team became part of the Cisco Webex conferencing and calling collaboration effort. Rowen became VP of Engineering for that voice technology group, and then VP for Collaboration AI. In October 2024, Rowen shifted to a part-time staff role focused on AI strategy and technology evangelism for Cisco.

== Research ==
Rowen's research work at Stanford included participating in design of the first MIPS processor, the development of optimizing RISC compilers and creation of an early logic synthesis and layout system, for his PhD dissertation: SWAMI: A Flexible Logic Implementation System.

He has written numerous articles on microprocessor architecture, system-on-chip design and design using application-specific processors. Rowen's book, Engineering the Complex SoC was published in 2004.
