= NEC RISCstation =

Computer workstations

The NEC RISCstation was a line of computer workstations made by NEC in the mid-1990s, based on MIPS RISC microprocessors and designed to run Microsoft Windows NT. A series of nearly identical machines were also sold by NEC in headless (i.e., no video card or framebuffer) configuration as the RISCserver series, and were intended for use as Windows NT workgroup servers.

The RISCstation 2000 was announced in June 1994 by NEC with an availability slated for the end of that summer with the release of Windows NT "Daytona" at a price between US$6000 to US$10000.

== Historical development ==
The RISCstations were based on a modified Jazz architecture licensed from MIPS Computer Systems, Inc. (and which was originally designed by Microsoft). Although architecturally similar to contemporaneous Intel 80386-based personal computers (including, for example, a PCI bus), the RISCstations were faster than the Pentium-based workstations of the time.

Although based on the Jazz design, the RISCstations did not use the G364 framebuffer, instead using a S3 Vision 968-based video card or a 3Dlabs GLiNT-based adapter in a PCI slot.

== Form factor ==
All RISCstations used a standard IBM AT-style tower or minitower case, a motherboard which also met the AT form factor standard, and PCI peripherals (such as the video card) for peripheral expansion.

== Operating systems ==
Several operating systems supported RISCstations.

Like all Jazz-based MIPS computers (such as the MIPS Magnum), the RISCstations ran the ARC console firmware to boot Windows NT in little-endian mode. The MIPS III architecture was capable of either little-endian or big-endian operation.

However, Microsoft stopped supporting the MIPS architecture in Windows NT after version 4.0. RISCstations ceased production in 1996.

In addition to Windows NT, NEC ported a version of Unix System V to the RISCstation.

Although support is lacking from Linux/MIPS for the RISCstation series, they are supported by NetBSD as NetBSD/arc and had been supported by OpenBSD, prior to the termination of the port in 1998.

== Models ==
The RISCstation line included:

- RISCstation Image - Acer PICA OEM
- RISCstation 2000
  - Dual-processor SMP system with two 150 MHz MIPS R4400 microprocessors
  - EISA
  - NCR53C700 SCSI
- RISCstation 2200
  - Single-processor system with a MIPS R4400 microprocessor
- RISCstation 2250
- RISCstation 4400
  - Dual-processor SMP system with two 250 MHz MIPS R4400 microprocessors

== Pricing ==
In March, 1995, a dual-CPU configuration of the RISCstation 2000 was priced at about $14,000, and came equipped with two 150 MHz MIPS R4400 CPUs, 64 MB of RAM, a 1 GB SCSI hard drive, a 3x CD-ROM drive and a 17-inch NEC-brand CRT monitor.
