= Acer PICA =

The M6100 PICA is a system logic chipset designed by Acer Laboratories introduced in 1993. PICA stands for Performance-enhanced Input-output and CPU Architecture. It was based on the Jazz architecture developed by Microsoft and supported the MIPS Technologies R4000 or R4400 microprocessors.

The chipset was designed for computers that run Windows NT, and therefore used ARC firmware to boot Windows NT. The chipset consisted of six chips: a CPU and secondary cache controller, a buffer, a I/O cache and bus controller, a memory controller, and two data buffers.

PICA was used by Acer in its Formula 4000 personal workstation, which NEC sold under the OEM name RISCstation Image.

== See also ==
- DeskStation Technology
