= MIPS RISC/os =

RISC/os
- Developer: MIPS Computer Systems, Inc.
- OS family: Unix
- Working state: Discontinued
- Supported platforms: MIPS architecture

RISC/os is a discontinued UNIX operating system developed by MIPS Computer Systems, Inc. from 1985 to 1992, for their computer workstations and servers, including such models as the MIPS M/120 server and MIPS Magnum workstation. It was also known as UMIPS or MIPS OS.

RISC/os was mainly based on UNIX System V with additions from 4.3BSD UNIX, ported to the MIPS architecture. It was a "dual-universe" operating system, meaning it had separate, switchable runtime environments that were compatible with either System V Release 3 or 4.3BSD. MIPS OS was one of the first 32-bit operating systems for RISC-based workstation-class computers. It was also one of the first 64-bit Unix releases for RISC based microprocessors, with the first 64-bit versions appearing in 1990. MIPS OS supported full 32-bit and 64-bit applications simultaneously using the underlying hardware architecture supporting the MIPS-IV instruction set. Later releases added support for System V Release 4 compatibility, R6000 processor support and later symmetric multiprocessing support on the R4400 and R6000 processors.

During the early 1990s, several vendors including DEC, Silicon Graphics, and Ardent licensed portions of the software MIPS had written for the RISC/os for their own Unix variants. Evans & Sutherland licensed RISC/os directly for its ESV series workstations. MIPS' influence was most visible as the C compiler and development tools shared by virtually all commercial Unixes for the MIPS processor, the low memory operating system code, and the ROM code for MIPS processors.

Because of its early UNIX heritage, RISC/os was limited in comparison to modern UNIX variants – for example, even the last releases of RISC/os did not support shared libraries.

In July 1992, Silicon Graphics purchased MIPS Computer Systems for $220M. Support for RISC/os was subsequently phased out.

== See also ==
- Timeline of operating systems
