= Edward P. Stritter =

Edward P. "Skip" Stritter, engineer and entrepreneur, was the chief architect of the Motorola 68000 microprocessor (used in the original Apple Computer Macintosh), a co-founder of the first commercial RISC company MIPS Computer Systems, the founder of Clarity Wireless, (acquired by Cisco Systems for $157 million) and founder of NeTPower. He also served on the Board of Overseers of the Thayer School of Engineering at Dartmouth College. He was nominated by the United States Justice Department to serve on a three-member technical board of overseers to ensure that Microsoft complied with the judgements of United States v. Microsoft.

He received his bachelor's degree from Dartmouth College in 1968 and his master's degree (1969) and PhD (1976) from Stanford University.
