= Chipidea =

Portuguese analog semiconductor IP design company (1997–2009)

- Formerly: Chipidea Microelectronica S.A.
- Company type: Private
- Industry: Semiconductor IP
- Founded: 1997
- Founder: José Epifânio da Franca
- Defunct: 2009
- Fate: Acquired by Synopsys
- Headquarters: Oeiras, Greater Lisbon, Portugal
- Number of locations: Maia; Gdańsk, Poland; Leuven, Belgium; Macau; Suzhou, China; Caen, France; Trondheim, Norway
- Key people: José Epifânio da Franca (founder)
- Products: ADCs, DACs, PLLs, RF front-ends, DC-DC Converters, Digital Transceivers, Line Drivers
- Owner: Synopsys (from 2009)
- Number of employees: 270 (2007)
- Parent: MIPS Technologies (2007–2009)

Chipidea was a Portuguese analog semiconductor IP design center, headquartered in Oeiras, Greater Lisbon subregion, which had been founded in 1997 by José Epifânio da Franca. In August 2007, it was bought by the US-based company MIPS Technologies for $147 million in cash plus future performance-based stock payments. On May 8, 2009, Synopsys acquired it as the Analog Business Group from MIPS Technologies for $22 million in cash.

== History ==
In 1997, Chipidea Microelectronica S.A. was founded as the first Portuguese Analog semiconductor IP design center. The company evolved into a supplier of Analog and Mixed-Signal IP.

The company's product portfolio included ADCs, DACs, PLLs and Synthesizers, Baseband Transmit and Receive Ports, RF front-ends, Analog and Digital Filters, Oversampling Modulators and Codec Analog Front-Ends, DC-DC Converters, Regulators, Digital Transceivers, Line Drivers, and other Physical Interfaces. Chipidea's application drivers were in Communications, Multimedia, and Consumer Electronics Applications.

The company had 270 staff involved in IP research and development, CAD and technology support and test and characterization. They were located at the main building in Oeiras, near Lisbon, as well as in other sites: Maia, near Porto, Portugal; Gdańsk, Poland; Leuven, Belgium; Macau; Suzhou, China; Caen, France; and Trondheim, Norway. Sales and marketing offices were located in the United States, Europe, and Asia.

In January 2007, Chipidea acquired Nordic Semiconductor ASA's Data Conversion business unit for US$5mm.

In late August 2007, Chipidea was acquired by US based company MIPS Technologies Inc. for $147 million in cash plus future performance-based stock payments. As a consequence of this, Chipidea became a newly formed business group inside MIPS Technologies, yet keeping its Portuguese workforce and facilities, as well as its complete product portfolio that continued to be sold under the Chipidea brand.

The brand was eventually discontinued and the remains of the original Portuguese company were fully integrated into MIPS Technologies.

On May 8, 2009, the Analog Business Group of MIPS was acquired by Synopsys for $22 million in cash.
