= SRM firmware =

Boot firmware for DEC Alpha-based computers

A screenshot of SRM loading aboot (a Linux bootloader)

The SRM firmware (also called the SRM console) is the boot firmware written by Digital Equipment Corporation (DEC) for computer systems based on the DEC Alpha microprocessor. SRM are the initials of (Alpha) System Reference Manual, the publication detailing the Alpha AXP architecture and which specified various features of the SRM firmware.

The SRM console was initially designed to boot DEC's OSF/1 AXP (later called Digital UNIX and finally Tru64 UNIX) and OpenVMS operating systems, although various other operating systems (such as Linux, NetBSD, OpenBSD, and FreeBSD, for example) were also written to boot from the SRM console. The third proprietary operating system published for the Alpha AXP architecture – Microsoft Windows NT – did not boot from SRM; instead, Windows booted from the ARC (multi platform "Advanced RISC Computing") boot firmware. (ARC is also known as AlphaBIOS.)

On many Alpha computer systems – for example, the Digital Personal Workstation – both SRM and ARC could be loaded onto the EEPROM which held the boot firmware. However, on some smaller systems (or large systems which were never intended to boot Windows), only one of the two boot firmware variants could fit onto the EEPROM at one time. For example, the flash EEPROM of certain models of the DEC Multia, which was a small, personal Alpha AXP workstation designed to run Windows NT, was only large enough to hold a single firmware.

The SRM console is capable of display on either a graphical adapter (such as a PCI VGA card) or, if no graphical console and/or local keyboard is detected, on a serial connection to a VT100-compatible terminal. In this way the SRM console is similar to the Open Firmware used in SPARC and Apple PowerMac computers, for example.

Upon system initialization, an Alpha AXP computer set to boot from the SRM console displays a short report of the software version of the firmware, and presents the "three chevron prompt" consisting of three greater-than signs:

Digital Personal WorkStation 433au
Console V7.2-1 Mar  6 2000 14:47:02
>>>

Several commands are available by typing them at the prompt, and a list of possible commands is available by entering the command help or man at the prompt. Various system variables for establishing automatic boot settings, parameter strings to be passed to an operating system and the like may also be set from the SRM prompt. The SRM firmware contains drivers for booting from boot media including SCSI hard disks and CD-ROM drives attached to a supported SCSI adapter, various IDE ATA and ATAPI devices, and network booting via BOOTP or DHCP is possible with supported network adapters.

When an appropriate disk boot device is available, the SRM console locates and loads the target primary bootstrap image using information written in the target disk boot block; in logical block zero. The boot block contains the disk location and block size of the target primary bootstrap image file, and SRM will load that into memory and will then transfer control to it.
