= Advanced Computing Environment =

Computing standard based on MIPS architecture

The Advanced Computing Environment (ACE) was defined by an industry consortium in the early 1990s to be the next generation commodity computing platform, the successor to personal computers based on Intel's 32-bit instruction set architecture. The effort found little support in the market and dissolved due to infighting within the group and a lack of sales.

== History ==
=== Formation ===
The consortium was announced on the 9th of April 1991 by Compaq, Microsoft, MIPS Computer Systems, Digital Equipment Corporation (DEC), and the Santa Cruz Operation (SCO). Although the consortium's definition of the Advanced RISC Computing (ARC) specification, indicating the details of an "open and scalable" hardware platform based on the MIPS architecture, was a significant focus of the initiative, the "key force" behind it was said to be Compaq recognising that it needed to pursue a strategy with MIPS in order to compete in the emerging personal workstation market. A week prior to the ACE announcement, Compaq had entered into a relationship with Silicon Graphics Inc. (SGI) involving an investment in SGI, the payment of advance royalties, and a strategy to co-develop low-cost workstation systems targeting a price range of "about $8,000 or $7,000 for a really usable system".

At the time it was widely believed that RISC-based systems would maintain a price/performance advantage over the ad hoc Wintel systems. However, it was also widely believed that Windows NT would quickly displace many other operating systems through the combined effects of a wide selection of software and the ease of building Wintel machines that supported it. ACE was formed to provide an alternative platform to Wintel, providing a viable alternative with the same advantages in terms of software support, and greater advantages in terms of performance.

The environment standardized on two hardware platforms: a personal computer platform based on the Intel 80386 and 80486 processors, and a workstation platform based on the ARC specification. To be supported by both hardware platforms were two operating systems: SCO UNIX with Open Desktop and what would become Windows NT (originally named OS/2 3.0). Other members of the consortium included Acer, Control Data Corporation, Kubota, NEC Corporation, NKK, Olivetti, Prime Computer, Pyramid Technology, Siemens, Silicon Graphics, Sony, Sumitomo, Tandem Computers, Wang Laboratories, and Zenith Data Systems. Besides these large companies, several startup companies built systems that featured ACE-related technologies.

Each of the companies involved had their own reasons for joining the ACE effort. MIPS wanted to reverse the fragmentation seen with existing MIPS-based systems that had limited wider adoption of the architecture. Various semiconductor companies, particularly "giants" such as Toshiba and NEC, were perceived as embracing the initiative to establish themselves and to take market share from Intel. DEC used the initiative as an attempt to take market share away from the workstation leader, Sun Microsystems, to respond to gains by Hewlett-Packard and IBM, and to proliferate its own technologies. Compaq, Microsoft and SCO were perceived to be using it as a defensive strategy to prevent "Sun taking over the desktop and replacing Intel-architecture PCs with RISC, Unix SparcStations" with the consequent loss of opportunities for those companies. By joining the initiative, SCO was able to broaden its portfolio to RISC platforms alongside its existing Intel platform products, and Microsoft needed vendor support for its "Portable OS/2", later Windows NT, strategy.

=== The Apache Group ===
Even prior to the announcement of the initiative, a number of companies headed by Compaq and including Siemens, Sony, Silicon Graphics, Unisys and Control Data Corporation favoured the adoption of Unix System V Release 4 (SVR4) as the means to provide portability between the MIPS and Intel architectures. Since SVR4 favoured big-endian operation, this subgroup of members was known as the Apache group, reportedly conceived as a pun on "Big Indian". (Note: Unrelated to the later Apache Software Foundation.) At that early stage, a different group known as the Gibraltar group, consisting primarily of DEC and SCO, sought to define interoperability with DEC's Ultrix operating system. The Apache group later adopted the name MIPS ABI after the demise of the ACE initiative.

The emerging rift within the ACE consortium was averted when it was decided to add support for SVR4 alongside OSF/1, thus placating the group which, by then, included Siemens, Sony, NEC, Prime Computer, Olivetti, Tandem and Pyramid among its members. Although concerns persisted about the domination of the initiative by the founding members, the introduction of SVR4 complicated the position of DEC and SCO whose involvement focused on SCO Open Desktop built on the OSF/1 kernel. However, the availability of SVR4 was regarded as a way of satisfying end-user demand, particularly by Compaq.

=== Dissolution ===
Even so, the ACE initiative (and consortium) began to fall apart little more than a year after it started, as it became apparent that there was not a mass market for an alternative to the Wintel computing platform. The upstart platforms did not offer enough performance improvement from the incumbent PC and there were major cost disadvantages of such systems due to the low volume production. When the initiative started, RISC based systems (running at 100-200 MHz at the time) had substantial performance advantages over Intel 80486 chips (running at approximately 60 MHz at the time), but the Pentium promised to reduce such advantages.

Compaq was the first company to leave the consortium, stating that with the departure of CEO Rod Canion, one of the primary backers behind the formation of ACE, they were shifting priorities away from higher-end systems. Other factors included Compaq's ongoing restructuring amidst disappointing financial results, the accelerated introduction of the Pentium, and increasing availability of Unix software for the Intel architecture. This was followed in short order by SCO announcing that they were suspending all work on moving their version of Unix to the MIPS platform. Canion's departure from Compaq had precipitated the dissolution of a technology development agreement between Compaq and SGI in early 1992 that had been established for the co-development of MIPS-based computers, although Compaq denied that this would result in the company withdrawing from the ACE consortium, which happened only months later. Peculiarly, Compaq had advocated for the adoption of Hewlett-Packard's Visual User Environment (VUE) by the ACE consortium, in preference to IXI's X.desktop, favoured by SCO and DEC, reportedly delaying the unveiling of SCO's Open Desktop and despite Hewlett-Packard not even being involved with the initiative.

There were other potential conflicts and difficulties for the consortium. In early 1992, SGI had announced its intention to acquire MIPS Computer Systems, leading vendors such as Control Data ("the largest OEM customer of both MIPS and SGI") to consider switching to other architectures over concerns about this pending acquisition and SGI's resulting control over the target platform. DEC had released their Alpha processor and were less interested in promoting a competing architecture, indicating continued low-end support for MIPS, but exhibiting a lack of commitment to future products, notably in relation to the MIPS R4000 line of processors and support for OSF/1 on the company's DECstation products. Digital had initially announced systems that were "compatible, as opposed to compliant" with ACE in the form of various DECstation and DECsystem 5000 series models, in advance of a more comprehensive specification and the availability of the R4000. The final DECstation models did, however, ship with R4000 family processors, although OSF/1 was never made commercially available.

Meanwhile, the accelerated delivery and anticipated performance improvements of Intel's upcoming Pentium processor, combined with more competitive pricing, made the "20 to 30 percent premium" of MIPS-based systems less attractive to vendors such as Compaq and their customers. Although ACE originally supported the x86 architecture, customers were reportedly confused by an incoherent message around the different hardware and software options encompassed by the initiative. Consequently, an increased emphasis on the MIPS architecture "as an informal recognition of what the organization has really been doing all along" was envisaged, focusing more on ARC as a way of delivering MIPS-based hardware. In April 1992, the ACE Executive Advisory Board refocused the initiative on systems software availability for the ARC platform.

Intel was never itself a member of ACE, with its processor architecture having been introduced to the effort by Compaq. Since MIPS had been seeking to gain market share at Intel's expense, the initiative was a competitive threat to Intel, forcing the company "to take greater steps to accommodate its customers". Indeed, one reported motivation for Compaq's involvement in ACE was to "light a fire under Intel" and get the company to produce a roadmap that was competitive enough for Compaq's customers. Intel's response was to accelerate the delivery of the Pentium and to pursue parallel development of three generations of future products (P5, P6 and P7), thus providing a roadmap that could dissuade its customers from adopting RISC architectures.

MIPS Computer Systems later refocused its efforts on the ARC specification in combination with its own RISC/os Unix implementation, mostly to satisfy those companies maintaining an interest in SVR4 on the architecture. With RISC/os 5.1, due later in 1992 being planned as the final release of the product, MIPS collaborated with UniSoft to make a direct port of SVR4 available for the platform. Two of the SVR4 adherents, Sony and NEC, would go on to arrange a Japanese initiative, the Open Computing Environment for MIPS Platform (OCMP), joined by several other Japanese vendors and subsidiaries of international companies in late 1992.

== ARC ==
The main product of the ACE group is the Advanced RISC Computing specification, or ARC. It was initially based on a MIPS-based computer hardware and firmware environment. MIPS Technologies announced its ARCsystem development kits in November 1991 for companies wishing to develop ARC-based systems, partnering with various semiconductor manufacturers including Toshiba and NEC for chipset products. NEC would later announce ARC chipsets and manufacturing kits for its own versions of the R4000 family. Other companies, notably DeskStation Technology, sought to provide support for ACE workstation producers.

Although ACE went defunct, and no computer was ever manufactured which fully complied with the ARC standard, the ARC system still exerts a widespread legacy in that all Microsoft Windows NT-based operating systems (such as Windows XP) used ARC conventions for naming boot devices before Windows Vista. Further, SGI used a modified version of the ARC firmware (which it called ARCS) in its systems. All SGI computers which run IRIX 6.1 or later (such as the Indy, Octane, etc.) boot from an ARCS console (which uses the same drive naming conventions as Windows, accordingly).

In addition, most of the various RISC-based computers designed to run Windows NT used versions of the ARC boot console to boot NT. Among these computers were:

- MIPS R4000-based systems such as the MIPS Magnum workstation
- all Alpha-based machines with a PCI bus designed prior to the end of support for Windows NT Alpha in September 1999 (the Alpha ARC firmware was also known as AlphaBIOS)
- most Windows NT-capable PowerPC computers (such as the IBM RS/6000 40P).

It was also predicted that Intel IA-32-based computers would adopt the ARC console, although only SGI ever marketed such IA-32-based machines with ARC firmware (namely, the SGI Visual Workstation series, which went on sale in 1999).

== See also ==
- The AIM alliance—a competing initiative based on the PowerPC, led by Apple Computer, IBM and Motorola
