= ECosCentric =

eCosCentric Limited
- Company type: Private
- Industry: Computer software
- Founded: 2002
- Headquarters: Cambridge, England
- Key people: eCos Founders
- Products: eCosPro
- Number of employees: ~10 (2005)
- Website: www.ecoscentric.com

eCosCentric Limited is a privately held company dedicated to open source software, with a distinct focus on eCos (Embedded Configurable Operating System). Founded in 2002 by the original eCos developers, it has headquarters in Cambridge, England from where it continues to support, develop and provide commercial services for eCos and RedBoot. eCosCentric also provides a commercially strengthened version of eCos, eCosPro, which is targeted at professional developers looking to integrate eCos within commercial products.

In 2017, eCosCentric Limited announced the latest 4.1 release of eCosPro, a "stable, fully tested and supported version of the operating system and RedBoot bootstrap firmware."
