= R2000 microprocessor =

Microprocessor developed by MIPS Computer Systems

The R2000 is a 32-bit microprocessor chipset developed by MIPS Computer Systems that implemented the MIPS I instruction set architecture (ISA). Introduced in May 1986, it was one of the first commercial implementations of a RISC architecture, preceded only by the IBM RT PC. The R2000 competed with Digital Equipment Corporation (DEC) VAX minicomputers and with Motorola 68020 and Intel Corporation 80386 microprocessors. R2000 users included Ardent Computer, DEC, Silicon Graphics, Northern Telecom and MIPS's own Unix workstations. The "first confirmed customer" of the R2000 was Prime Computer.

The chipset consisted of the R2000 microprocessor, R2010 floating-point accelerator, and four R2020 write buffer chips. The core R2000 chip executed all non-floating-point instructions with a simple short pipeline. This chip also controlled the external code and data caches, made of fast standard SRAM chips organized with direct indexing and one-cycle read latency. The R2000 chip contained a small translation lookaside buffer for mapping virtual memory addresses. The R2010 chip held the floating point registers, floating point data paths, and their longer simple pipeline. Writes to main memory DRAM took several cycles to fully complete, but the R2020 chips queued and completed up to 4 pending writes to main memory, allowing the R2000 core to proceed without stalling itself. In the absence of cache misses, this chipset sustained an instruction completion rate of one instruction per ALU cycle. This was more efficient than non-RISC microprocessors of that time, which needed several cycles per instruction. The initial R2000A, clocked at 12.5 MHz, offered 8-10 Million integer Instructions Per Second (MIPS), or 0.9 Million FLoating Point Operations Per Second (MFLOPS), and would appear in the like of the 1987 SGI IRIS 4D and 1988 DECstation 2100 workstations. 1986 also saw similar technology in Sun's first SPARC microprocessor, Hewlett Packard's first PA-RISC microprocessor, and the first Acorn RISC Machine (ARM) evaluation kits shipping to developers.

Overall speed was limited by the cache size and cache cycle time. The R2000 chipset and SRAM was initially sold only as a complete circuit board to ensure good cache bus timings. In 1987 system builders began using the chipset in arbitrary new board designs.

The R2000 was available in 8.3, 12.5 and 15 MHz grades. The die contained 110,000 transistors and measured 80 mm^{2} in a 2.0 μm double-metal CMOS process. MIPS was a fabless semiconductor company, that is, they did not have the capability to fabricate integrated circuits. The chipset was initially fabricated for MIPS by Sierra Semiconductor and Toshiba. In December 1987, MIPS licensed Integrated Device Technology, LSI Logic, and Performance Semiconductor to also fabricate and market the R2000. Sierra and Toshiba continued to serve as foundries.

LSI fabricated the chipset in its 2.0 μm double-metal CMOS process and marketed it as the LR2000. Performance Semiconductor fabricated the chipset in its PACE-I 0.8 μm double-metal CMOS process and marketed it as the PR2000.

In 1988, an improved version was introduced, the R2000A. It was composed of the R2000A and R2010A ICs. It operated at 12.5 and 16.67 MHz. It has been used extensively in embedded applications such as printer controllers.

In 1988, the R2000 was followed by the R3000, using a similar overall system design but faster chip implementation.
