= SONIC (Ethernet controller) =

SONIC (System-Oriented Network Interface Controller) DP83932 is a National Semiconductor 10 Mbit/s Ethernet controller. In the early 1990s, integrated Ethernet subsystems based on the SONIC controller were used in computer workstations such as the MIPS Magnum family and the Olivetti M700, inter alia.
