= DeskStation Technology =

American computer manufacturer

- Type: Private
- Industry: Computers
- Founded: 1989; 37 years ago in Lenexa, Kansas
- Founder: Don Peterson
- Defunct: 2000
- Website: dti.com at the Wayback Machine (archived October 18, 1997)

DeskStation Technology was a manufacturer of RISC-based computer workstations intended to run Windows NT. DeskStation was based in Lenexa, Kansas.

== AMD Am29000-based systems ==
DeskStation announced a range of motherboards for systems based on the AMD Am29000 processor in 1991. These ranged from the Model 162 with a 16 MHz processor achieving a claimed 9 MIPS and costing $2,495 to the Model 252 with a 25 MHz processor achieving 14 MIPS and costing $3,495.

== MIPS-based systems ==
In late 1991, DeskStation announced a workstation based on the MIPS R3000A CPU, the IceStation 3000, that was to be the basis of a product compliant with the Advanced Computing Environment (ACE) specification, with this workstation already existing in prototype form and with early production models to be made available for beta-testing within a matter of weeks. However, at that time, none of the operating systems featured in the ACE specification were available: Windows NT being expected in early 1992 and the ACE-targeted SCO Unix product expected in late 1992. Consequently, DeskStation hoped to license Ultrix from Digital as an interim measure, aiming to provide binary compatibility with the eventual SCO product. The workstation featured a system architecture incorporating ISA and TURBOchannel buses, along with a "private peripheral bus" offering 32-bit data transfers. A range of ports were provided - serial, parallel, audio and mouse ports - along with floppy and hard drive controllers. SCSI ports and drives, a CD-ROM drive, modem ports, internally fitted modems, and an Ethernet port were to be offered as options. 8 MB of RAM was specified, upgradeable to 64 MB. Two configurations were to be offered: a lower-priced configuration and a standard configuration, respectively offering 25 MHz and 33 MHz R3000A CPUs, hard drives of 150 MB and 210 MB, being delivered with 14-inch and 17-inch colour monitors, and being priced at $4,995 and $7,995. Although the workstation's CPU could not be upgraded, a future product with an upgradeable CPU module and using the EISA bus was planned.

Subsequently, in 1993 and with Windows NT in beta testing, DeskStation introduced a range of workstation models in the Evolution RISC PC line, such as the rPC/40 and rPC/44, based on the R4000 and R4400 CPUs respectively. Configured with 16 MB of RAM, 512 KB of secondary cache memory, floppy drive, and 200 MB hard drive, the systems were fitted with a video adapter from S3 Graphics and were bundled with 14-inch colour monitors. The rPC/40 was priced at $3,995 and the rPC/44 at $4,995, aiming to compete with similarly priced Intel 80486-based machines running Windows NT. The most highly-specified model upon review in 1993, the rPC 444e/100, came with 64 MB of RAM, a 21-inch monitor, 500 MB SCSI hard drive and CD-ROM drive, costing $9,995. These models conformed to the ARC computer specification (and implemented the associated firmware), but ARC was used by vendors like DeskStation "only as a starting point", with the Evolution models incorporating more traditional PC technologies such as the EISA peripheral bus, on which peripherals and the main system RAM would reside. The CPUs employed by the range were the 50 MHz R4000PC and R4400PC variants, clocked internally at 100 MHz, but only offering on-chip primary cache memory and not built-in support for secondary cache memory. Consequently, DeskStation provided a custom chipset to support the secondary cache and the necessary interfacing to the EISA bus chipset.

In late 1993, DeskStation announced a new chipset called LogiCore and a new range of Windows NT workstations with the Tyne branding, integrating MIPS-based CPUs with ISA and VESA technologies. The entry-level Tyne V4600 employed the R4600 CPU clocked at 100 MHz and was fitted with 16 MB of RAM, expandable to 256 MB, a 240 MB hard drive, offering VGA graphics and costing $2,995. It was complemented by two higher-end models, the V4433 and V4450 offering 133 MHz and 150 MHz R4400 CPUs respectively. These models were fitted with 32 MB of RAM, incorporated SCSI-2 peripherals including a 500 MB hard drive and a CD-ROM drive, supported Super VGA graphics, and were bundled with a 17-inch monitor. Pricing was accordingly higher at $9,495 and $10,495 for the respective systems which were to become available in the first quarter of 1994.

DeskStation was commissioned by NewTek to produce a hardware rendering accelerator for its Video Toaster and LightWave 3D products, but this partnership was dissolved with only "a handful" of units delivered to industry customers. This accelerator, known as the Video Toaster Screamer, was specified with four R4400 CPUs and had been announced in late 1993, but following the product's cancellation, DeskStation followed up in 1994 with a cut-down version of the product, known as the Raptor, featuring two R4400 CPUs each with 64 MB of RAM and running "a limited version of Windows NT", this having a total cost of $13,900. An updated version, the Raptor Plus, featuring faster 133 MHz R4600 CPUs each with 128 MB of RAM, cost $16,900. These solutions formed the basis of a complete workstation, the Raptor II, featuring a single 133 MHz R4600 CPU, 32 MB of RAM, 500 MB SCSI hard drive, CD-ROM drive, Ethernet port, 24-bit colour graphics adapter and 17-inch colour monitor, selling for $10,000. The Raptor II supported the TRIANGL OpenGL accelerator card made by Oki for use with Windows NT.

== Alpha-based systems ==
Later, when Windows NT was ported to the Alpha architecture, DeskStation created a flexible computer platform known as Uniflex that allowed CPUs and other elements of the system to be swapped either during production or by the end-user, thus supporting MIPS and Alpha CPUs, and thereby providing the possibility of upgrading a MIPS-based system to use an Alpha CPU. The platform employed the PCI bus. The machines offering these capabilities were introduced as part of the Raptor series and included the Raptor 3, along with various Raptor Reflex models.

DeskStation introduced its Ruffian RPX line of workstations and servers in 1997, based around the Digital Semiconductor 21174 core logic chip, permitting the initially supported 600 MHz Alpha 21164 CPU to be replaced with faster parts from Digital, Mitsubishi or Samsung, with the motherboard offering six PCI slots, Ultra-Wide SCSI, a total memory capacity of up to 768 MB of RAM and up to 2 MB of "fast synchronous cache". Systems were fitted with a Matrox Millennium graphics card as standard, upgradeable to a S3 Graphics or OpenGL-capable card, and were priced from $5,995. DeskStation also initiated an OEM strategy, selling its RPX 164-2 motherboard to such systems manufacturers for $1,350 and aimed to license the technology to other systems developers.

In 1998, DeskStation licensed its motherboard designs and chipsets to Samsung, a DEC (Digital Equipment Corporation) Alpha licensee, following on from a previous initiative "promoting and expanding the market for Windows NT systems based on Alpha processors", with DeskStation having been developing systems based on Samsung's Alpha 21164 processor module.

== Fate ==
DeskStation encountered difficult trading conditions in the late 1990s. Despite expansion and extension of their real estate lease in 1996, the company experienced a period of "financial turmoil" in 1997 due to decreasing systems prices, partially driven by Digital reducing its own Alpha system motherboard prices, leading to the company cancelling a planned initial public offering. Further difficulties in 1998 led DeskStation to scale back manufacturing operations and to focus on "building customised computer products". In 2000, DeskStation was sold to Singapore-based Tri-M Technologies, with founder Don Peterson having moved on to found Framecast Communications, a company offering advertising-funded e-mail, scheduling, chat and search services for integration with university Web sites.

== See also ==
- Acer PICA
- MIPS Computer Systems
- MIPS Magnum
- ShaBLAMM! NiTro-VLB
