= MIPS Technologies =

American fabless semiconductor design company

Coordinates: 37.4201°N 122.0728°W

MIPS Tech LLC

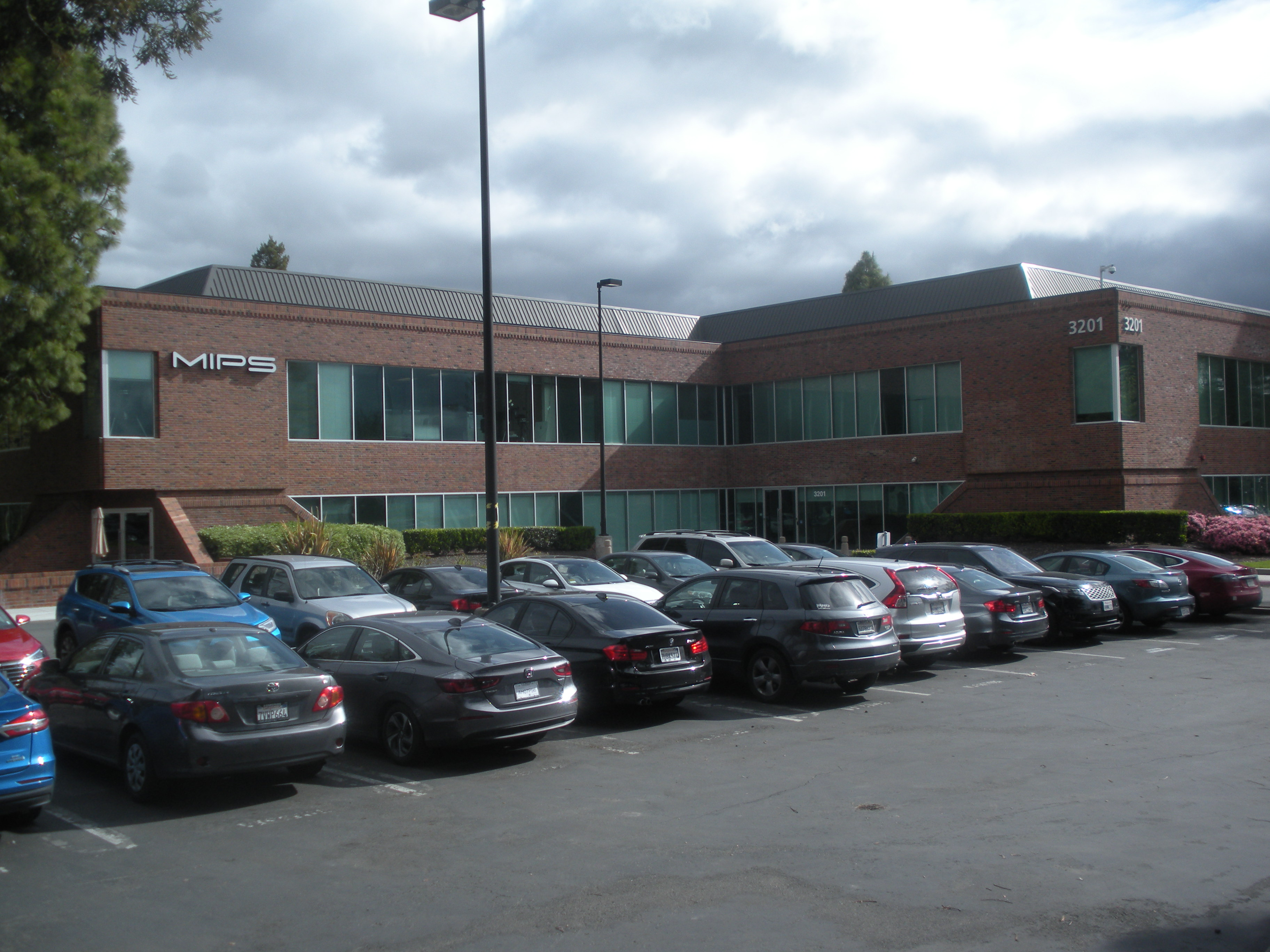
- Former MIPS Technologies building in Santa Clara
- Formerly: MIPS Computer Systems, Inc. (1984–1992); MIPS Technologies, Inc. (1992–2021)
- Type: Private
- Traded as: Nasdaq: MIPS (1998–2013)
- Industry: RISC microprocessors
- Founded: 1984; 42 years ago
- Founders: John L. Hennessy; Chris Rowen
- Headquarters: San Jose, California, U.S.
- Key people: Sameer Wasson (CEO)
- Products: Semiconductor intellectual property
- Number of employees: up to 50 (according to LinkedIn in May 2018), previously 146 (September 2010)
- Parent: Silicon Graphics (1992–1998); Imagination Technologies (2013–2017); Wave Computing (2018–2021); GlobalFoundries (2025–)
- Website: mips.com

MIPS Tech LLC, formerly MIPS Computer Systems, Inc. and MIPS Technologies, Inc., is an American fabless semiconductor design company that is most widely known for developing the MIPS architecture and a series of RISC CPU chips based on it. MIPS provides processor architectures and cores for digital home, networking, embedded, Internet of things and mobile applications.

MIPS was founded in 1984 to commercialize the work being carried out at Stanford University on the MIPS architecture, a pioneering RISC design. The company generated intense interest in the late 1980s, seeing design wins with Digital Equipment Corporation (DEC) and Silicon Graphics (SGI), among others. By the early 1990s the market was crowded with new RISC designs and further design wins were limited. The company was purchased by SGI in 1992, by that time its only major customer, and won several new designs in the game console space. In 1998, SGI announced it would be transitioning off MIPS and spun off the company.

After several years operating as an independent design house, in 2013 the company was purchased by Imagination Technologies, best known for its PowerVR graphics processor family. They were sold to Tallwood Venture Capital in 2017 and then purchased less than a year later by Wave Computing. Wave declared bankruptcy in 2020, emerging in 2021 as MIPS and announcing that the MIPS architecture was being abandoned in favor of RISC-V designs.

In May 2022, MIPS previewed its first RISC-V CPU IP cores, the eVocore P8700 and I8500 multiprocessors. In December 2022, MIPS announced availability of the P8700.

In July 2025, MIPS was acquired by GlobalFoundries.

== History ==
Logo used in 1990

MIPS Computer Systems Inc. was founded in 1984 by a group of researchers from Stanford University including John L. Hennessy and Chris Rowen. These researchers had worked on a project called MIPS (Microprocessor without Interlocked Pipeline Stages), one of the projects that pioneered the RISC concept. Other principal founders were Skip Stritter, formerly a Motorola technologist, and John Moussouris, formerly of IBM.

The first CEO was Vaemond Crane, formerly President and CEO of Computer Consoles Inc., who arrived in February 1985 and departed in June 1989. He was replaced by Bob Miller, a former senior IBM and Data General executive. Miller ran the company through its IPO and subsequent sale to Silicon Graphics.

In 1986, MIPS Computer Systems designs drew the attention of companies such as Cadnetix, Prime Computer and Silicon Graphics (SGI), these adopting the R2000 for new products. SGI, having noted that the Motorola 68000 series of processors was "at the end of its price-performance curve", adopted the MIPS architecture for its computers. Identifying the "time-to-market issues" of companies introducing workstation products, MIPS introduced a range of component kits, processor boards and memory boards, intended as "building blocks" for such companies to build into systems. Additionally, development systems such as the M/500 were sold, intended to support software development at systems vendors building MIPS-based hardware products. In December 1989, MIPS held its first IPO. That year, Digital Equipment Corporation (DEC) released a Unix workstation based on the MIPS design.

Following the development of the R2000 and R3000 microprocessors, a change in management was accompanied by a new goal of becoming a computer vendor, but the company found itself unable to compete in the computer market against much larger established companies, and struggled to support the costs of developing both chips and systems (MIPS Magnum).

=== Acquisition by SGI ===
To assure the supply of future generations of MIPS microprocessors (the 64-bit R4000), SGI acquired the company in 1992 for $333 million, and renamed it "MIPS Technologies Inc.", a wholly owned subsidiary of SGI.

MIPS RISC Certified Power emblem

During SGI's ownership of MIPS, the company introduced the R8000 in 1994 and the R10000 in 1996 and a follow-up the R12000 in 1997. During this time, two future microprocessors code-named The Beast and Capitan were in development; these were cancelled after SGI decided to migrate to the Itanium architecture in 1998. As a result, MIPS was spun out as an intellectual property licensing company, offering licences to the MIPS architecture as well as microprocessor core designs.

On June 30, 1998, MIPS held an IPO, raising about $16.3 million with an offering price of $14 a share, with SGI retaining a majority of shares. In 1999, SGI announced it would overhaul its operations; it planned to continue introducing new MIPS processors until 2002, but its server business would include Intel's processor architectures as well. SGI spun MIPS out completely on June 20, 2000, by distributing the remaining MIPS shares it held as a stock dividend to SGI shareholders.

=== Post-spinoff ===
In early 2008, MIPS laid off 28 employees from its processor business group. On August 13, 2008, MIPS announced a loss of $108.5 million for its fiscal fourth-quarter and that it would lay off another 15% of its workforce. At the time MIPS had 512 employees.

In 2010, Sandeep Vij was named CEO of MIPS Technologies. Vij studied under John Hennessy as a Stanford University graduate student. Prior to taking over at MIPS, Vij was an executive at Cavium Networks, Xilinx and Altera.

EE Times reported that MIPS had 150 employees as of November 1, 2010. An August 14, 2008, EDN article had reported that MIPS had over 500 employees at the time; if true, then MIPS reduced their total workforce by 70% between 2008 and 2010.

In 2012, the company's main R&D center was in Sunnyvale, California, with engineering facilities in Shanghai China; Beaverton, Oregon; and, Bristol and Kings Langley, both in England. It also had offices in Hsinchu, Taiwan; Tokyo, Japan; Remscheid, Germany; and, Haifa, Israel.

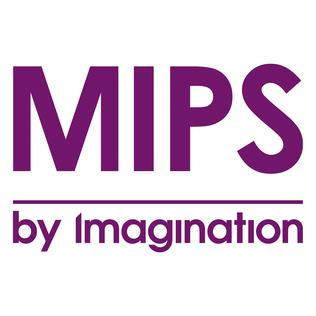
MIPS branding as used by Imagination Technologies

In the first quarter of 2013, MIPS sold off its business to two companies. 498 out of 580 of MIPS patents were sold to Bridge Crossing, a company created by Allied Security Trust, and all processor-specific patents and the other parts of the company were sold to Imagination Technologies. Imagination had outbid Ceva Inc to buy MIPS with an offer of $100 million, and was investing to develop the architecture for the embedded processor market.

In 2017, under financial pressure itself, Imagination Technologies sold the MIPS processor business to a California-based investment company, Tallwood Venture Capital. Tallwood in turn sold the business to Wave Computing in 2018, both of these companies reportedly having their origins with, or ownership links to, a co-founder of Chips and Technologies and S3 Graphics. Despite the regulatory obstacles that had forced Imagination to divest itself of the MIPS business prior to its own acquisition by Canyon Bridge, bankruptcy proceedings for Wave Computing indicated that the company had in 2018 and 2019 transferred full licensing rights for the MIPS architecture for China, Hong Kong and Macau to CIP United, a Shanghai-based company.

In May 2018, according to the company's presence on LinkedIn, there may have been fewer than 50 employees.

In 2021, MIPS announced it would no longer develop the MIPS architecture, and would begin making chips based on the RISC-V architecture. In 2022, the company announced availability of its first RISC-V CPU IP core, the eVocore P8700.

In September 2023, MIPS named former Texas Instruments (TI) executive Sameer Wasson CEO. Wasson spent 18 years at TI, most recently as vice president, Business Unit (BU) Manager, Processors.

In July 2025, MIPS was acquired by GlobalFoundries.

=== Company timeline ===
Year	
1981	Dr. John Hennessy at Stanford University founds and leads Stanford MIPS, a research program aimed at building a microprocessor using RISC principles.
1984	MIPS Computer Systems, Inc. co-founded by Dr. John Hennessy, Skip Stritter, and Dr. John Moussouris
1986	First product ships: R2000 microprocessor, Unix workstation, and optimizing compilers
1988	R3000 microprocessor
1989	First IPO in November as MIPS Computer Systems with Bob Miller as CEO
1991	R4000 microprocessor
1992	SGI acquires MIPS Computer Systems. Transforms it into internal MIPS Group, and then incorporates and renames it to MIPS Technologies, Inc. (a wholly owned subsidiary of SGI)
1994	R8000 microprocessor
1994	Sony PlayStation released, using an R3000 CPU with custom GTE coprocessor
1996	R10000 microprocessor; Nintendo 64 released, incorporating a R4300i processor and coprocessor from MIPS
1998	Re-IPO as MIPS Technologies, Inc.
2000	Sony PlayStation 2 released, using an R5900 CPU with custom vector co-processors
2002	Acquires Algorithmics Ltd, a UK-based MIPS development hardware/software and consultancy company.
September 6, 2006	Acquires First Silicon Solutions (FS2), a Lake Oswego, Oregon company as a wholly owned subsidiary. FS2 specializes in silicon IP, design services and OCI (On-Chip Instrumentation) development tools for programming, testing, debug and trace of embedded systems in SoC, SOPC, FPGA, ASSP and ASIC devices.
2007	MIPS Technologies acquires Portugal-based mixed-signal intellectual property company Chipidea
February 2009	MIPS Joins Linux Foundation
May 8, 2009	Chipidea is sold to Synopsys.
June 2009	Android is ported to MIPS
September 30, 2009	MIPS Technologies joins the Open Handset Alliance
January 2010	Sandeep Vij appointed as CEO
January 2011	MIPS introduces the first Android-MIPS based Set top box at CES.
April 2011	MIPS Technologies ports Google's Android 3.0, "Honeycomb", to the MIPS architecture
August 2012	MIPS Technologies ports Google's Android 4.1, "Jelly Bean". With Indian company Karbonn Mobiles announces world's second tablet running Android 4.1.
February 8, 2013	MIPS Technologies is sold to Imagination Technologies for $100 million.
September 22, 2017	MIPS business is sold by Imagination Technologies to Tallwood Venture Capital as Tallwood MIPS Inc. for $65 million.
June 2018	MIPS Tech Inc. is acquired by Wave Computing.
May 2019	Art Swift is appointed CEO of Wave Computing.
September 2019	After Swift quietly leaves Wave Computing after four months, Sanjai Kohli is appointed as the new CEO.
April 2020	Wave Computing files for bankruptcy.
March 2021	Wave Computing emerges from bankruptcy, renames itself as "MIPS" and joins RISC-V International. Development of the MIPS architecture ceases. All future designs are announced to be based on the RISC-V architecture. Sanjai Kohli continues as MIPS CEO.
May 2022	MIPS announced its first RISC-V CPU IP cores, the eVocore P8700 and I8500 multiprocessors.
September 2023	Sameer Wasson is appointed MIPS CEO.
January 2024	MIPS adds two former SiFive executives to its executive team, appointing Drew Barbier as VP of products and Brad Burgess as chief architect.
July 2025	GlobalFoundries agrees to acquire MIPS

== Notable contributors ==
Notable people who have worked at MIPS include James Billmaier, Steve Blank, Joseph DiNucci, John L. Hennessy, Todd Bezenek, David Hitz, Earl Killian, Dan Levin, John Mashey, John P. McCaskey, Bob Miller, Stratton Sclavos, and Skip Stritter.

== Products ==
MIPS Technologies created the processor architecture that is licensed to chip makers. Before it was acquired by Imagination Technologies, the company had 125+ licensees who shipped more than 500 million MIPS-based processors each year.

MIPS processor architectures and cores are used in home entertainment, networking and communications products. The company licensed its 32- and 64-bit architectures as well as 32-bit cores.

The MIPS32 architecture is a high-performance 32-bit instruction set architecture (ISA) that is used in applications such as 32-bit microcontrollers, home entertainment, home networking devices and mobile designs. MIPS customers license the architecture to develop their own processors or license off-the-shelf cores from MIPS that are based on the architecture.

The MIPS64 architecture is a high performance 64-bit instruction set architecture that is widely used in networking infrastructure equipment through MIPS licensees such as Cavium Networks and Broadcom.

SmartCE (Connected Entertainment) is a reference platform that integrates Android, Adobe Flash platform for TV, Skype, the Home Jinni ConnecTV application and other applications. SmartCE lets OEM customers create integrated products more quickly.

=== MIPS processor core families ===
The MIPS processor cores are divided by Imagination into three major families:

- Warrior: hardware virtualization, hardware multi-threading, and SIMD
  - M-class: M5100 and M5150, M6200 and M6250
  - I-class: I6400, I7200
  - P-class: P5600, P6600
- Aptiv: microAptiv (compact, real-time embedded processor core), interAptiv (multiprocessor, multi-threaded core with a nine-stage pipeline), proAptiv (super-scalar, deeply out-of-order processor core with high CoreMark/MHz score)
- Classic. 4K, M14K, 24K, 34K, 74K, 1004K (multicore and multithreaded) and 1074K (superscalar and multithreaded) families.

=== MIPS eVocore RISC-V CPU IP cores ===
The MIPS eVocore CPUs are the first RISC-V CPU IP cores from MIPS. Both cores provide support for privileged hardware virtualization, user defined custom extensions, multi-threading, hybrid debug, and functional safety. They include:

- eVocore P8700: multiprocessing system combining a deep pipeline with multi-issue out-of-order (OOO) execution and multi-threading. It can scale up to 64 clusters, 512 cores and 1,024 harts/threads.
- eVocore I8500: in-order multiprocessing system. Each core combines multi-threading and a triple-issue pipeline.

== Licensees ==
MIPS Technologies had a strong customer licensee base in home electronics and portable media players; for example, 75 percent of Blu-ray Disc players were running on MIPS Technologies processors. In the digital home, the company's processors were predominantly found in digital TVs and set-top boxes. The Sony PlayStation Portable used two processors based on the MIPS32 4K processor.

Within the networking segment, licensees include Cavium Networks and Broadcom. Cavium has used up to 48 MIPS cores for its OCTEON family network reference designs. Broadcom ships Linux-ready MIPS64-based XLP, XLR, and XLS multicore, multithreaded processors. Licensees using MIPS to build smartphones and tablets include Actions Semiconductor and Ingenic Semiconductor. Tablets based on MIPS include the Cruz tablets from Velocity Micro. TCL Corporation is using MIPS processors for the development of smartphones.

Companies can also obtain an MIPS architectural licence for designing their own CPU cores using the MIPS architecture. Distinct MIPS architecture implementations by licensees include Broadcom's BRCM 5000.

Other licensees include Broadcom, which has developed MIPS-based CPUs for over a decade, Microchip Technology, which leverages MIPS processors for its 32-bit PIC32 microcontrollers, Qualcomm Atheros, MediaTek and Mobileye, whose EyeQ chips are based on cores licensed from MIPS.

The first announced licensee for MIPS' RISC-V CPUs is Mobileye, who adopted the MIPS eVocore P8700 for autonomous driving SoCs.

== Operating systems ==
MIPS is widely supported by Unix-like systems, including Linux, FreeBSD, NetBSD, and OpenBSD.

Google's processor-agnostic Android operating system is built on the Linux kernel. MIPS originally ported Android to its architecture for embedded products beyond the mobile handset, where it was originally targeted by Google but MIPS support was dropped in 2018. In 2010, MIPS and its licensee Sigma Designs announced the world's first Android set-top boxes. By porting to Android, MIPS processors power smartphones and tablets running on the Android operating system.

OpenWrt is an embedded operating system based on the Linux kernel. While it currently runs on a variety of processor architectures, it was originally developed for the Linksys WRT54G, which used a 32-bit MIPS processor from Broadcom. The OpenWrt Table of Hardware now includes MIPS-based devices from Atheros, Broadcom, Cavium, Lantiq, MediaTek, etc.

Real-time operating systems that run on MIPS include CMX Systems, eCosCentric's eCos, ENEA OSE, Express Logic's ThreadX, FreeRTOS, Green Hills Software's Integrity, LynuxWorks' LynxOS, Mentor Graphics, Micrium's Micro-Controller Operating Systems (μC/OS), QNX Software Systems' QNX, Quadros Systems Inc.'s RTXC Quadros RTOS, Segger's embOS and Wind River's VxWorks.

HPE NonStop Guardian OS has a version running on MIPS.

== See also ==
- Prpl Foundation
