= Locus Computing Corporation =

- Type: Private
- Industry: Software
- Founded: 1982
- Founders: Gerald J. Popek, Charles S. Kline and Gregory I. Thiel
- Defunct: August 17, 1995
- Fate: Acquired by Platinum Technology Inc.
- Successor: Platinum Technology
- Headquarters: Santa Monica, California, later Inglewood, California, United States
- Key people: Gerald J. Popek, CTO and chairman.
- Products: LOCUS; AIX PS/2, AIX 370; AIX TCF; OSF/1 AD; Merge; UnixWare NonStop Clusters
- Number of employees: 300

Locus Computing Corporation was formed in 1982 by Gerald J. Popek, Charles S. Kline and Gregory I. Thiel to commercialize the technologies developed for the LOCUS distributed operating system at UCLA. Locus was notable for commercializing single-system image software and producing the Merge package which allowed the use of DOS and Windows 3.1 software on Unix systems.

Locus was acquired by Platinum Technology Inc in 1995.

== Products ==
=== AIX for IBM PS/2 and System/370 ===
Locus was commissioned by IBM to produce a version of the AIX UNIX based operating system for the PS/2 and System/370 ranges. The single-system image capabilities of LOCUS were incorporated under the name of AIX TCF (transparent computing facility).

=== OSF/1 AD for the Intel Paragon ===
Locus was commissioned by Intel to produce a multiprocessor version of OSF/1 for the Intel Paragon a massively parallel NoRMA (No Remote Memory Access) system. The system was known as OSF/1 AD, where AD stood for "Advanced Development".

To allow inter processor process migration and communication between the individual nodes of the Paragon system they re-worked the TCF technology from LOCUS as Transparent Network Computing, or TNC, inventing the concept of the VPROC (virtual process) an analogy of the VNODE (virtual inode) from the SunOS virtual file system.

=== UnixWare NonStop Clusters ===
Locus was commissioned by Tandem Computers to include their TNC technology in a highly available single-system image clustering system based on SCO UnixWare, UnixWare NonStop Clusters.

During the course of the project Locus was acquired by Platinum Technology Inc, who transferred the team working on NonStop Clusters to Tandem.

Tandem were later bought by Compaq. The UnixWare product was acquired from SCO by Caldera Systems/Caldera International, who discontinued commercialization of the NonStop Clusters product in favor of the simpler Reliant HA system. Compaq then decided to release the NonStop Clusters code as open source software, porting it to Linux as the OpenSSI project.

=== Merge ===
Merge was a system developed by Locus in late 1984 for the AT&T 6300+ computer, which allowed DOS (and hence DOS applications) to be run under the native UNIX SVR2 operating system.

The 6300+ used an Intel 80286 processor and included special-purpose circuitry to allow virtualization of the 8086 instruction set used by DOS.

Merge was later modified to use the virtual 8086 mode provided by Intel 80386 processors. It was sold for Microport SVR3 and later SCO Unix and UnixWare.

In the late 1980, the main commercial competitor of Merge was VP/IX developed by Interactive Systems Corporation and Phoenix Technologies.

Around 1994, Merge included an innovative socket API that used Intel ring 2 for virtualization. Although this was the fastest network access of any Windows virtualization system then on the market, it did not increase sales enough to make Locus independent. This socket API was designed and developed by Real Time, Inc. of Santa Barbara.

Locus eventually joined the Microsoft WISE program which gave them access to Windows source code, which allowed later versions of Merge to run Windows Shrink wrapped applications without a copy of Windows.

=== PC-Interface ===
PC-Interface was a popular Lan-based Cross-Platform Integration Toolkit for Unix, providing MS-DOS/Windows/Macintosh and Unix integration using Unix as the file system. It supported AIX, Santa Cruz Operation Inc, UnixWare and Motorola 9000 and many other Unixes and came with one Mac and one MS-DOS/Windows client.
