= Amoeba (operating system) =

Distributed operating system

- Developer: Andrew S. Tanenbaum; Frans Kaashoek
- OS family: Unix-like
- Latest release: 5.3 / 30 July 1996; 29 years ago
- Available in: English
- Supported platforms: i386/i486, MIPS, Motorola 68030, NS 32016, Sun 3/50 and 3/60, SPARC, VAX
- Kernel type: Microkernel
- License: MIT License
- Official website: www.cs.vu.nl/pub/amoeba/

Amoeba is a distributed operating system developed by Andrew S. Tanenbaum and others at the Vrije Universiteit Amsterdam. The aim of the Amoeba project was to build a timesharing system that makes an entire network of computers appear to the user as a single machine. Development at the Vrije Universiteit was stopped: the source code of the latest version (5.3) was last modified on 30 July 1996.

The Python programming language was originally developed for this platform.

== Overview ==
The goal of the Amoeba project was to construct an operating system for networks of computers that would present the network to the user as if it were a single machine. An Amoeba network consists of a number of workstations connected to a "pool" of processors, and executing a program from a terminal causes it to run on any of the available processors, with the operating system providing load balancing. Unlike the contemporary Sprite, Amoeba does not support process migration. The workstations would typically function as networked terminals only. Aside from workstations and processors, additional machines operate as servers for files, directory services, TCP/IP communications etc.

Amoeba is a microkernel-based operating system. It offers multithreaded programs and a remote procedure call (RPC) mechanism for communication between threads, potentially across the network; even kernel-threads use this RPC mechanism for communication. Each thread is assigned a 48-bit number called its "port", which serves as its unique, network-wide "address" for communication.

The user interface and APIs of Amoeba were modeled after Unix and compliance with the POSIX standard was partially implemented; some of the Unix emulation code consists of utilities ported over from Tanenbaum's other operating system, MINIX. Early versions used a "homebrew" window system, which the Amoeba authors considered "faster ... in our view, cleaner ... smaller and much easier to understand", but version 4.0 uses the X Window System (and allows X terminals as terminals). The system uses FLIP as a network protocol.

In 1991, the exclusive worldwide distribution rights to Amoeba were granted to ACE Associated Computer Experts.

== See also ==
- Distributed computing
- Multikernel
- Plan 9 from Bell Labs
