= Gerald J. Popek =

American computer scientist (1946–2008)

- Born: Gerald John Popek; September 22, 1946; Passaic, New Jersey, US
- Died: July 20, 2008 (aged 61); Los Angeles, California, US
- Education: New York University; Harvard University
- Known for: Popek and Goldberg virtualization requirements
- Scientific career
- Fields: Computer scientist
- Workplaces: UCLA; Locus Computing Corporation; United Online

Gerald John "Jerry" Popek (September 22, 1946 – July 20, 2008) was an American computer scientist, known for his research on operating systems and virtualization.

With Robert P. Goldberg he proposed the Popek and Goldberg virtualization requirements, a set of conditions necessary for a computer architecture to support system virtualization.

== Early life and education ==
Born on September 22, 1946, in Passaic, New Jersey, Popek graduated from Rutherford High School in Rutherford, New Jersey in 1964, where he was the class valedictorian. He graduated from New York University in 1968 with a B.S. in Nuclear Engineering. In 1970, he completed an M.S. in Applied Mathematics from Harvard University. In 1973, he completed a Ph.D, also in Applied Mathematics, at Harvard and moved to UCLA. At UCLA, he worked on virtualisation, network security, reliable operating systems and Databases. He became Director of the Center for Experimental Computer Science.

== Academic career ==
Around 1980, he worked on the LOCUS distributed operating system, an early implementation of the single-system image idea.

Between April 1981 and June 1983, Popek served on the DARPA "steering committee" for BSD UNIX formed by Duane Adams of DARPA to guide the design work leading to 4.2BSD. Other members of the committee were Bob Fabry, Bill Joy and Sam Leffler from UCB, Alan Nemeth and Rob Gurwitz from BBN, Dennis Ritchie from Bell Labs, Keith Lantz from Stanford, Rick Rashid from Carnegie-Mellon, Bert Halstead from MIT and Dan Lynch from ISI.

== Business career ==
In order to pursue the commercial opportunities of LOCUS he formed the Locus Computing Corporation in 1982, taking on the roles of Chief technical officer and Chairman. In 1995, Locus was acquired by Platinum Technology Inc. in a share swap. Popek took on the role of CTO of Platinum. In 1999, he left Platinum to become CTO of CarsDirect.com, "the first Internet car company" In 2000, he left CarsDirect.com to join NetZero also as CTO In 2001, NetZero merged with its competitor Juno to form United Online Inc. and Dr Popek became Executive Vice President and CTO of the new company.

== Awards ==
In June 2009, he was posthumously awarded the 2009 USENIX Lifetime Achievement Award.
