= Chaos (operating system) =

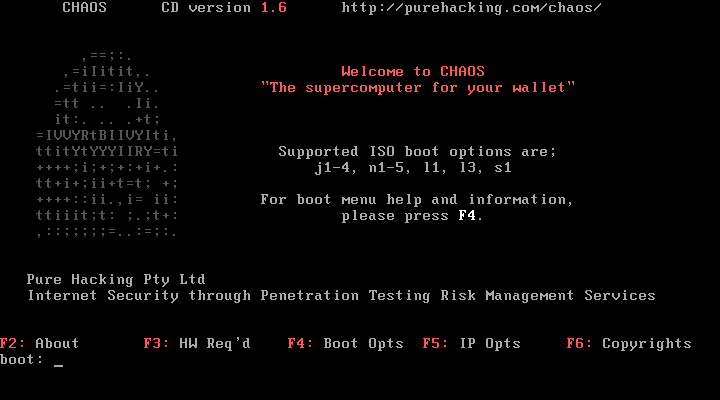
- Chaos-1.6 boot welcome screen
- Developer: Midnight Code / Ian Latter
- OS family: Linux (Unix-like)
- Working state: Current
- Source model: Open source
- Latest release: 1.6 / April 2005
- Kernel type: Monolithic kernel
- Default user interface: text (bash)
- License: Various
- Official website: http://midnightcode.org/projects/chaos/

Chaos is a small (6 MB) Linux distribution designed for creating ad hoc computer clusters.

== About ==
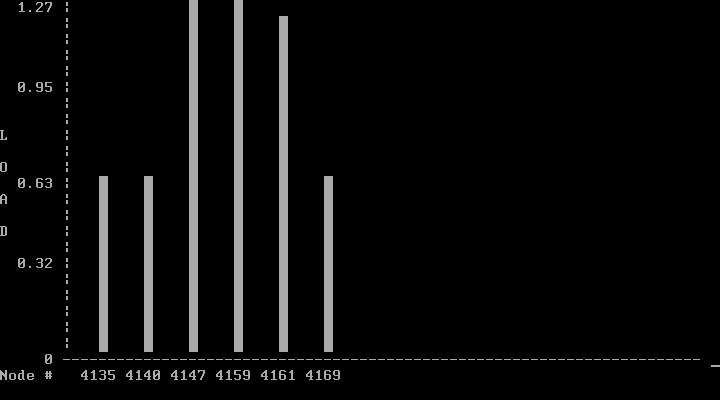
A six node Chaos/OpenMosix cluster

=== Description ===
Chaos creates a basic node in an OpenMosix cluster and is typically not deployed on its own; cluster builders will use feature-rich Linux distributions (such as Quantian or ClusterKnoppix) as a "head node" in a cluster to provide their application software, while the Chaos distribution runs on "drone nodes" to provide "dumb power" to the cluster.

While this deployment model suits the typical cluster builder, OpenMosix is a peer-based cluster, consisting of only one type of node. All OpenMosix nodes are inherently equal and each can be, simultaneously, parent and child.

== See also ==
- List of Linux distributions
- Live CD
- List of Live CDs
- OpenMosix
