= Fast Local Internet Protocol =

The Fast Local Internet Protocol (FLIP) is a communication protocol for LAN and WAN, conceived for distributed applications. FLIP was designed at the Vrije Universiteit Amsterdam to support remote procedure call (RPC) in the Amoeba distributed operating system.

== Comparison to TCP/IP ==
In the OSI model, FLIP occupies the network layer (3), thus replacing IP, but it also obviates the need for a transport layer (4) protocol like TCP.

Layers of functionality in OSI, TCP/IP, and FLIP.
Layer	OSI	TCP/IP	FLIP
7	Application	User-defined	User-defined
6	Presentation	User-defined	Amoeba Interface Language (AIL)
5	Session	Not used	RPC and Group communication
4	Transport	TCP or UDP	Not needed
3	Network	IP	FLIP
2	Data Link	E.g., Ethernet	E.g., Ethernet
1	Physical	E.g., Coaxial cable	E.g., Coaxial cable

== Properties ==
FLIP is a connectionless protocol designed to support transparency (with respect to the underlying network layers of the OSI model: 2. data link and 1. physical), efficient RPC, group communication, secure communication and easy network management. The following FLIP properties helps to achieve the requirements of distributed computing:

1. FLIP identifies entities with a location-independent 64-bit identifier called Network Service Access Points (NSAPs). An entity can, for example, be a process; contrary to the IP protocol where an IP address identifies a host.
2. FLIP uses a one-way mapping between the “private” address, used to register an endpoint of a network connection, and the “public” address used to advertise the endpoint.
3. FLIP routes messages based on NSAP (transparency).
4. FLIP discovers routes on demand.
5. FLIP uses a bit in the message header to request transmission of sensitive messages across trusted networks.

== See also ==
- IL (network protocol)
