= Tread mark =

Tread mark may refer to:

- Skid mark, a mark left by the skidding of an object, often a tire
- Tread Marks, a tank combat computer game
- TreadMarks, distributed shared computer memory system

== See also ==
- Footprint
