= Single system image =

Cluster dedicated operating system

In distributed computing, a single system image (SSI) cluster is a cluster of machines that appears to be one single system. The concept is often considered synonymous with that of a distributed operating system, but a single image may be presented for more limited purposes, just job scheduling for instance, which may be achieved by means of an additional layer of software over conventional operating system images running on each node. The interest in SSI clusters is based on the perception that they may be simpler to use and administer than more specialized clusters.

Different SSI systems may provide a more or less complete illusion of a single system.

== Features of SSI clustering systems ==
Different SSI systems may, depending on their intended usage, provide some subset of these features.

=== Process migration ===
Many SSI systems provide process migration. Processes may start on one node and be moved to another node, possibly for resource balancing or administrative reasons. (Note: for example it may be necessary to move long running processes off a node that is to be closed down for maintenance) As processes are moved from one node to another, other associated resources (for example IPC resources) may be moved with them.

=== Process checkpointing ===
Some SSI systems allow checkpointing of running processes, allowing their current state to be saved and reloaded at a later date. (Note: Checkpointing is particularly useful in clusters used for high-performance computing, avoiding lost work in case of a cluster or node restart.) Checkpointing can be seen as related to migration, as migrating a process from one node to another can be implemented by first checkpointing the process, then restarting it on another node. Alternatively checkpointing can be considered as migration to disk.

=== Single process space ===
Some SSI systems provide the illusion that all processes are running on the same machine - the process management tools (e.g. "ps", "kill" on Unix like systems) operate on all processes in the cluster.

=== Single root ===
Most SSI systems provide a single view of the file system. This may be achieved by a simple NFS server, shared disk devices or even file replication.

The advantage of a single root view is that processes may be run on any available node and access needed files with no special precautions. If the cluster implements process migration a single root view enables direct accesses to the files from the node where the process is currently running.

Some SSI systems provide a way of "breaking the illusion", having some node-specific files even in a single root. HP TruCluster provides a "context dependent symbolic link" (CDSL) which points to different files depending on the node that accesses it. HP VMScluster provides a search list logical name with node specific files occluding cluster shared files where necessary. This capability may be necessary to deal with heterogeneous clusters, where not all nodes have the same configuration. In more complex configurations such as multiple nodes of multiple architectures over multiple sites, several local disks may combine to form the logical single root.

=== Single I/O space ===
Some SSI systems allow all nodes to access the I/O devices (e.g. tapes, disks, serial lines and so on) of other nodes. There may be some restrictions on the kinds of accesses allowed (For example, OpenSSI can't mount disk devices from one node on another node).

=== Single IPC space ===
Some SSI systems allow processes on different nodes to communicate using inter-process communications mechanisms as if they were running on the same machine. On some SSI systems this can even include shared memory (can be emulated in software with distributed shared memory).

In most cases inter-node IPC will be slower than IPC on the same machine, possibly drastically slower for shared memory. Some SSI clusters include special hardware to reduce this slowdown.

=== Cluster IP address ===
Some SSI systems provide a "cluster IP address", a single address visible from outside the cluster that can be used to contact the cluster as if it were one machine. This can be used for load balancing inbound calls to the cluster, directing them to lightly loaded nodes, or for redundancy, moving the cluster address from one machine to another as nodes join or leave the cluster. (Note: "leaving a cluster" is often a euphemism for crashing)

== Examples ==
Examples here vary from commercial platforms with scaling capabilities, to packages/frameworks for creating distributed systems, as well as those that actually implement a single system image.

SSI Properties of different clustering systems
| Name | Process migration | Process checkpoint | Single process space | Single root | Single I/O space | Single IPC space | Cluster IP address (Note: Many of the Linux based SSI clusters can use the Linux Virtual Server to implement a single cluster IP address) | Source Model | Latest release date (Note: Green means software is actively developed) | Supported OS |
|---|---|---|---|---|---|---|---|---|---|---|
| Amoeba (Note: Amoeba development is carried forward by Dr. Stefan Bosse at BSS Lab) | Yes | Yes | Yes | Yes | Unknown | Yes | Unknown | Open | July 30, 1996 | Native |
| AIX TCF | Unknown | Unknown | Unknown | Yes | Unknown | Unknown | Unknown | Closed | March 30, 1990 | AIX PS/2 1.2 |
| NonStop Guardian (Note: Guardian90 TR90.8 Based on R&D by Tandem Computers c/o Andrea Borr at) | Yes | Yes | Yes | Yes | Yes | Yes | Yes | Closed | September 2025 | NonStop OS |
| Inferno | No | No | No | Yes | Yes | Yes | Unknown | Open | August 13, 2025 | Native, Windows, Irix, Linux, OS X, FreeBSD, Solaris, Plan 9 |
| Kerrighed | Yes | Yes | Yes | Yes | Unknown | Yes | Unknown | Open | June 14, 2010 | Linux 2.6.30 |
| LinuxPMI (Note: LinuxPMI is a successor to openMosix) | Yes | Yes | No | Yes | No | No | Unknown | Open | June 18, 2006 | Linux 2.6.17 |
| LOCUS (Note: LOCUS was used to create IBM AIX TCF) | Yes | Unknown | Yes | Yes | Yes | Yes (Note: LOCUS used named pipes for IPC) | Unknown | Closed | 1988 | Native |
| MOSIX | Yes | Yes | No | Yes | No | No | Unknown | Closed | October 24, 2017 | Linux |
| openMosix (Note: openMosix was a fork of MOSIX) | Yes | Yes | No | Yes | No | No | Unknown | Open | December 10, 2004 | Linux 2.4.26 |
| OpenPMIx (Note: The OpenPMIx project is continuing development of the former openMosix code) | Yes | Yes | No | Yes | No | No | Unknown | Open | September 26, 2025 | Linux |
| Open-Sharedroot (Note: Open-Sharedroot is a shared root Cluster from ATIX) | No | No | No | Yes | No | No | Yes | Open | September 1, 2011 | Linux |
| OpenSSI | Yes | No | Yes | Yes | Yes | Yes | Yes | Open | February 18, 2010 | Linux 2.6.10 (Debian, Fedora) |
| Plan 9 | No | No | No | Yes | Yes | Yes | Yes | Open | January 10, 2015 | Native |
| Sprite | Yes | Unknown | No | Yes | Yes | No | Unknown | Open | 1992 | Native |
| TidalScale (now HPE) | Yes | No | Yes | Yes | Yes | Yes | Yes | Closed | August 17, 2020 | Linux, FreeBSD |
| TruCluster | No | Unknown | No | Yes | No | No | Yes | Closed | October 1, 2010 | Tru64 |
| VMScluster | No | No | Yes | Yes | Yes | Yes | Yes | Closed | November 20, 2024 | OpenVMS |
| z/VM | Yes | No | Yes | No | No | Yes | Unknown | Closed | September 30, 2024 | Native |
| UnixWare NonStop Clusters (Note: UnixWare NonStop Clusters was a base for OpenSSI) | Yes | No | Yes | Yes | Yes | Yes | Yes | Closed | June 2000 | UnixWare |

== See also ==
- Diskless shared-root cluster
- Distributed lock manager
- Distributed cache
- Parallel Virtual Machine - multiple system image alternative
- Message Passing Interface - multiple system image alternative
