= Kerrighed =

Clustering system for Linux

Kerrighed is an open source single-system image (SSI) cluster software project. The project started in October 1998 at the Paris research group The French National Institute for Research in Computer Science and Control. From 2006 to 2011, the project was mainly developed by Kerlabs. In January 2012 the Linux clustering mission of Kerlabs was adopted by a new company: We Cluster, Inc. headquartered in Pacific Grove, California. January 18, 2012: Kerrighed 3.0 has been ported to Ubuntu 12.04 with Linux Kernel v3.2.

== Background ==
Kerrighed is implemented as an extension to the Linux operating system. It helps scientific applications such as numerical simulations to use more power. Such applications may be using OpenMP, Message Passing Interface, and/or a Posix multithreaded programming model.

Kerrighed implements a set of global resource management services that aim at making resource distribution transparent to the applications, at managing resource sharing in and between applications and at taking benefit of the whole cluster resources for demanding applications. Kerrighed provides a development framework allowing to easily implement dynamic scheduling policies without kernel modification.

Kerrighed provides several features such as a distributed shared memory with a sequential consistency model, processes migration from one cluster node to another, and to a limited extent checkpointing.

Kerrighed uses a "container" concept: this entity is an abstraction of both files and memory. Each Kerrighed node starts a root container in which only local resources are available. To access resources globally, one must start the Kerrighed container on one node then add other nodes to the Kerrighed container.

== See also ==
- LinuxPMI
- OpenMosix
- OpenSSI
