= IL (network protocol) =

Transport-layer protocol designed at Bell Labs for the Plan 9 OS

Internet Link
- Communication protocol
- Abbreviation: IL
- Developer(s): Bell Labs
- OSI layer: Transport layer (4)

The Internet Link protocol or IL is a connection-based transport-layer protocol designed at Bell Labs originally as part of the Plan 9 operating system and is used to carry 9P. It is assigned the Internet Protocol number of 40. It is similar to TCP but much simpler.

Its main features are:

- Reliable datagram service
- In-sequence delivery
- Internetworking using IP
- Low complexity, high performance
- Adaptive timeouts

As of the Fourth Edition of Plan 9, 2003, IL is deprecated in favor of TCP/IP because it doesn't handle long-distance connections well.

== Header ==
IL header format
Offset	Octet	0								1								2								3							
Octet	Bit	0	1	2	3	4	5	6	7	8	9	10	11	12	13	14	15	16	17	18	19	20	21	22	23	24	25	26	27	28	29	30	31
0	0	Version and header length								Type of service								Packet length															
4	32	Identification																Fragment information															
8	64	Time to live								Protocol								Header checksum															
12	96	IP source																															
16	128	IP destination																															
20	160	Checksum including header																Packet length															
24	192	Packet type								Special								Src port															
28	224	Dst port																Sequence id↴															
34	272	↪Acked sequence																															

struct IPIL
{
    byte    vihl;       /* Version and header length */
    byte    tos;        /* Type of service */
    byte    length[2];  /* packet length */
    byte    id[2];      /* Identification */
    byte    frag[2];    /* Fragment information */
    byte    ttl;        /* Time to live */
    byte    proto;      /* Protocol */
    byte    cksum[2];   /* Header checksum */
    byte    src[4];     /* Ip source */
    byte    dst[4];     /* Ip destination */
    byte    ilsum[2];   /* Checksum including header */
    byte    illen[2];   /* Packet length */
    byte    iltype;     /* Packet type */
    byte    ilspec;     /* Special */
    byte    ilsrc[2];   /* Src port */
    byte    ildst[2];   /* Dst port */
    byte    ilid[4];    /* Sequence id */
    byte    ilack[4];   /* Acked sequence */
};

== See also ==
- Fast Local Internet Protocol
