= Multikernel =

Type of operating system kernel

A multikernel operating system treats a multi-core machine as a network of independent cores, as if it were a distributed system. It does not assume shared memory but rather implements inter-process communications as message-passing. Barrelfish was the first operating system to be described as a multikernel.

== See also ==
- Amoeba distributed operating system
- Distributed operating system
- eMCOS
