= Barrelfish (operating system) =

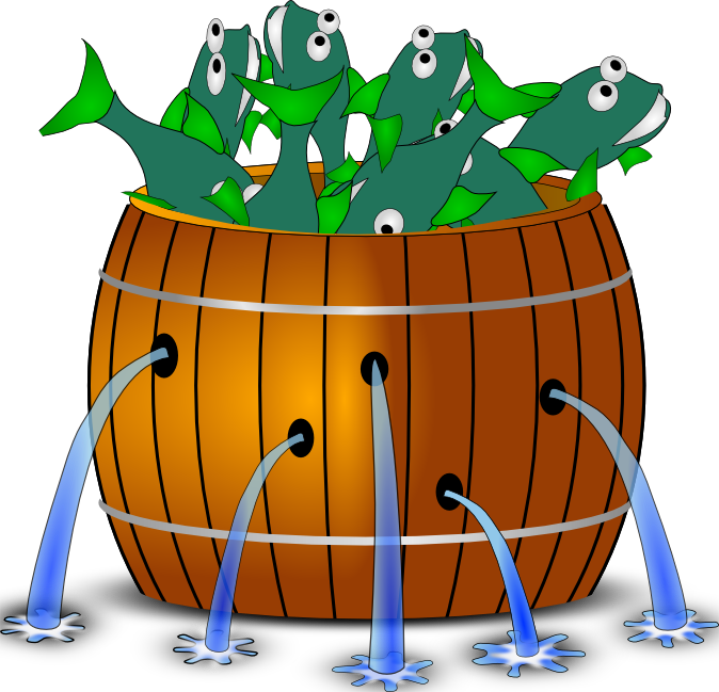
- Developer: ETH Zurich with assistance of Microsoft Research
- Working state: Discontinued
- Source model: Open source
- Initial release: September 15, 2009; 15 years ago
- Latest release: 2020.03.23 / March 23, 2020; 5 years ago
- Repository: github.com/BarrelfishOS/barrelfish
- Kernel type: Multikernel, Microkernel
- License: MIT License
- Official website: www.barrelfish.org

Barrelfish is a discontinued, open-source distributed operating system, which was developed by researchers at ETH Zurich and Microsoft Research. The original motivation for the operating system was formed in 2006 by Timothy Roscoe and Paul Barham, and was announced in September 2009. The final official release was on March 23, 2020.

The Barrelfish project's goal was to create a operating system that would account for an increasing amount of processor cores in modern computers, and continuously gather statistics about the hardware so that it could make more accurate decisions when scheduling and transferring data. It was also planned that it would have compatibility with other operating systems such as the Linux and Microsoft Windows. The team behind Barrelfish intended take inspiration from previous research, including Nemesis, a project which Roscoe and Barham had previously worked on in the past.

== Name origin ==
The inspiration for the name comes for the name came from the phrase "shooting fish in a barrel", which represented the dynamic structure that the operating system was planned to have. While originally being developed in collaboration with Microsoft Research, it was also partly supported by Hewlett Packard Enterprise Labs, Huawei, Cisco, Oracle, and VMware before it was discontinued.

== See also ==
- Singularity
- Midori
