= Dyne:bolic =

Linux distribution

dyne:bolic

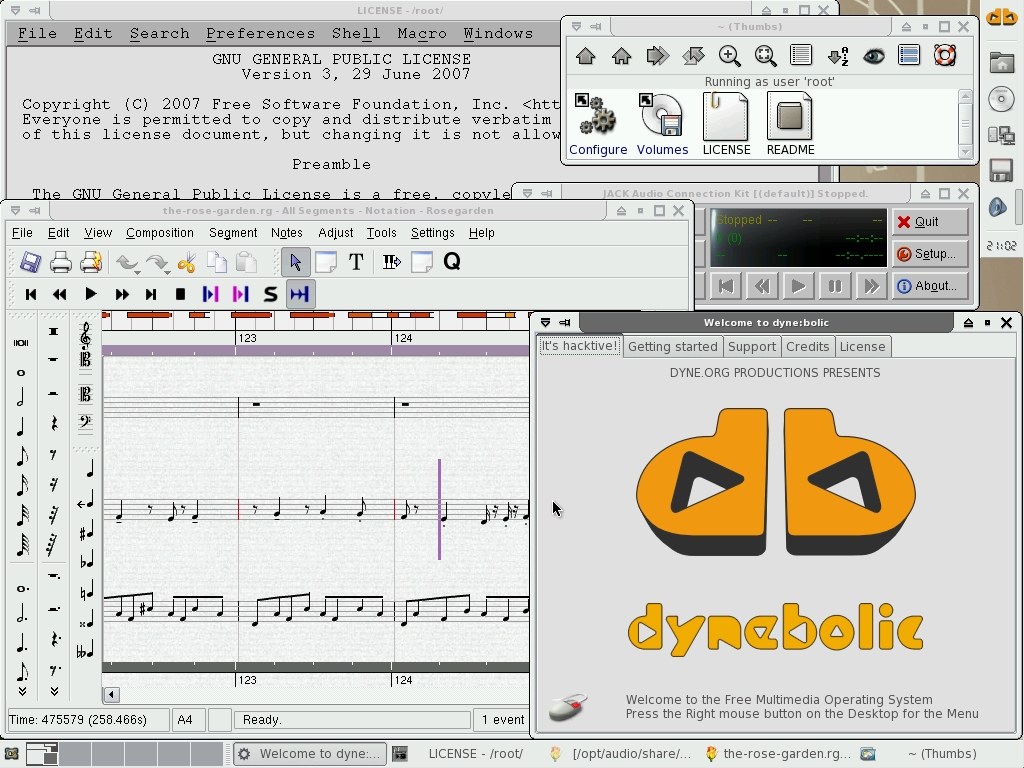
- dyne:bolic XFCE User Interface Screenshot
- Developer: Denis Roio
- OS family: Unix-like (Linux kernel)
- Working state: Current
- Initial release: March 15, 2005; 21 years ago
- Latest release: 4.0.0-beta / March 21, 2024; 2 years ago
- Supported platforms: x86
- Kernel type: Monolithic (Linux-libre)
- Userland: GNU
- Default user interface: Version 4: KDE Plasma 5 Version 3: GNOME 2 Version 2: Xfce
- License: FSDG
- Official website: www.dyne.org/software/dynebolic/

dyne:bolic GNU/Linux is a live CD/DVD distribution based on the Linux kernel. It is shaped by the needs of media activists, artists and creators to be a practical tool with a focus on multimedia production, that delivers a large assortment of applications. It allows manipulation and broadcast of both sound and video with tools to record, edit, encode, and stream. In addition to multimedia specific programs, dyne:bolic also provides word processors and common desktop computing tools.

Termed "Rastasoft", a portmanteau of Rastafari and software, by its author, it is based entirely on free software, and as such is recommended and endorsed by the GNU Project. dyne:bolic is created by volunteers and the author and maintainer Jaromil, who also included multimedia tools such as MusE, HasciiCam, and FreeJ in the distribution.

A decade after version 3 was released, dyne:bolic re-entered development with version 4 beta in 2021.

== Live CD/DVD ==
dyne:bolic is intended to be used as Live CD/DVD. It does not require installation to a hard drive. It automatically attempts to recognize most devices and peripherals, including sound and video components. It is designed to be able to run on older and slower computers, its kernel is optimized for low latency and performance. This optimization makes the distribution ideal for audio and video production, potentially transforming PCs into full media stations. Consequently, the software included may not always be the newest version available.

== Modules ==
dyne:bolic can be extended by downloading additional modules, such as development tools or common software like LibreOffice. These modules are SquashFS files placed in the modules/ directory of a dock or a burnt CD and are automatically integrated upon boot.

== System requirements ==
The basic system requirements for version 1.x and 2.x were relatively low. Only requiring a PC with a Pentium MMX or AMD K5 (i586) class CPU, 64 MB of RAM, and an IDE CD-ROM drive is sufficient. Some versions of dyne:bolic 1.x were ported by co-developer Smilzo to be used on the Xbox game console; multiple Xbox installations could be clustered. However, console installation and clustering are currently not supported by version 2.x and up.

Version 3.0, codenamed MUNIR and released on September 8, 2011, features higher system requirements compared to its predecessors. It is the first version to be distributed as a DVD image. Recommended specifications include a Pentium II or AMD K6-2 class processor, 256 MB of RAM, and an IDE/SATA DVD-ROM drive. This version, just like its predecessors, also does not require a hard disk.

== Installation ==
The user copies the dyne/ directory from a CD or DVD to a suitably formatted partition or drive, a process referred to as Docking. This filesystem will be recognized and booted by the CD or DVD. There is an option to install a GNU GRUB bootloader or edit an existing one. Booting from a floppy disk is also supported.

User settings can be saved on a disc or USB flash drive in a writable image file containing the /home and /etc filesystems, described as Nesting, which can also be encrypted for better privacy.

== Release history ==
=== dyne:bolic 4.x ===
This version, currently 4.0 Beta, is based on Devuan 5 with Linux kernel 6.8. It features KDE Plasma 5 as the default desktop environment.

=== dyne:bolic 3.x ===
This version, currently 3.0 Beta 4, uses the Linux kernel 3.0.1 and is distributed as a DVD-ROM image. GNOME 2 is used as the default desktop environment and Grub2 as the boot loader.

=== dyne:bolic 2.x ===
This version, currently 2.5.2, uses the Linux kernel 2.6 and is distributed as a CD-ROM image. The default desktop environment is Xfce.

=== dyne:bolic 1.x ===
In this version, dyne:bolic uses the Linux kernel 2.4 stored on a CD-ROM image and brought the ability to create nests and docks on either a hard disk or USB drive.

Some features that were initially present in dyne:bolic 1.x, but later dropped included:

- openMosix - a clustering software
- Ability to boot on an Xbox game console
- Window Maker - as the X window manager
- CIA World Factbook - as a local copy

== See also ==
- Comparison of Linux distributions
- GNU/Linux naming controversy
- List of Linux distributions based on Debian
- Musix GNU+Linux – another free distribution for multimedia enthusiasts
