= OSF/1 =

Variant of Unix developed by the Open Software Foundation

- Developer: Open Software Foundation
- OS family: Unix
- Working state: Discontinued
- Initial release: January 1992; 34 years ago
- Available in: English
- Supported platforms: MIPS, DEC Alpha, PA-RISC
- Kernel type: Hybrid, Microkernel

OSF/1 is a variant of the Unix operating system developed by the Open Software Foundation during the late 1980s and early 1990s. OSF/1 is one of the first operating systems to have used the Mach kernel developed at Carnegie Mellon University, and is probably best known as the native Unix operating system for DEC Alpha architecture systems.

In 1994, after AT&T had sold UNIX System V to Novell and the rival Unix International consortium had disbanded, the Open Software Foundation ceased funding of research and development of OSF/1. The Tru64 UNIX variant of OSF/1 was supported by HP until 2012.

== Background ==
In 1988, during the so-called "Unix wars", Digital Equipment Corporation (DEC) joined with IBM, Hewlett-Packard, and others to form the Open Software Foundation (OSF) to develop a version of Unix named OSF/1. The aim was to compete with System V Release 4 from AT&T Corporation and Sun Microsystems, and it has been argued that a primary goal was for the operating system to be free of AT&T intellectual property. The fact that OSF/1 is one of the first operating systems to have used the Mach kernel is cited as support of this assertion. Digital also strongly promoted OSF/1 for real-time applications, and with traditional UNIX implementations at the time providing poor real-time support at best, the real-time and multi-threading support can be interpreted as having been heavily dependent on the Mach kernel. At the time of its introduction, OSF/1 became the third major flavor of UNIX together with System V and BSD.

OSF/1 at its inception combined Mach 2.5 with a large part of the BSD kernel (based on the 4.3-Reno release) to implement the UNIX API, with this monolithic kernel arrangement continuing through the OSF/1 1.2 release, although the adoption of a microkernel had already been foreseen. OSF/1 1.3 introduced such a microkernel in the form of Mach 3.0, hosting Unix system services separately in user space to provide the existing OSF/1 functionality.

== Vendor releases ==
DEC's first release of OSF/1 (OSF/1 Release 1.0) in January 1992 was for its line of MIPS-based DECstation workstations, however this was never a fully supported product. DEC ported OSF/1 to their new Alpha AXP platform as DEC OSF/1 AXP Release 1.2, released in March 1993. OSF/1 AXP is a full 64-bit operating system, preserving the kernel architecture based on Mach 2.5 and 4.3BSD components. From OSF/1 AXP 2.0 onwards, UNIX System V compatibility was also integrated into the system, but the architecture remained centred on the Mach 2.5 modular kernel, unlike later OSF versions of the system. Although OSF/1 2.0 was also developed for DECStation MIPS systems, it was "never officially released or sold". Subsequent releases are named Digital UNIX, and later, Tru64 UNIX.

Upon its acquisition of Apollo Computer in 1989, HP announced plans to introduce OSF/1 on both companies' products by late 1990. HP released a port of OSF/1 to the early HP 9000/700 workstations based on the PA-RISC 1.1 architecture. This was withdrawn soon afterwards due to lack of software and hardware support compared to competing operating systems, specifically HP-UX.

As part of the AIM alliance and the resulting PowerOpen specification, Apple Computer intended to base A/UX 4.0 for its PowerPC-based Macintoshes upon OSF/1, but the project was cancelled and PowerOpen deprecated.

IBM used OSF/1 as the basis of the AIX/ESA operating system for System/370 and System/390 mainframes.

Intel Paragon supercomputers used a version of OSF/1 featuring the Mach 3.0 kernel.

OSF/1 was also ported by Kendall Square Research to its proprietary microarchitecture used in the KSR1 supercomputer.

== OSF MK ==
The Open Software Foundation created OSF MK, an evolution of OSF/1, incorporating the OSF Mach kernel (or OSF Microkernel) based on Mach 3.0 along with a variety of other functionality including the OSF/1 Single Server providing the Unix system personality. The complete system in the form of MK 5.0 was made available under commercial terms to OSF/1 licensees in April 1993. In contrast to the OSF/1 server, which was encumbered by proprietary Unix licensing, the microkernel itself remained freely available for adoption by other projects. In OSF MK, it contains applicable code from the University of Utah Mach 4 kernel (such as the "Shuttles" modification used to speed up message passing) and applicable code from the many Mach 3.0 variants that sprouted off from the original Carnegie Mellon University Mach 3.0 kernel. It also consists of improvements made by the OSF such as built-in collocation capability, realtime improvements, and rewriting of the IPC RPC component for better performance.

== OSF/1 AD ==
OSF/1 AD (Advanced Development) was a distributed version of OSF/1 developed for massively parallel supercomputers by Locus Computing Corporation. Variants of OSF/1 AD are on several such systems, including the Intel Paragon XP/S and ASCI Red, Convex Exemplar SPP-1200 (as SPP-UX) and the Hitachi SR2201 (as HI-UX MPP).

== OSF/2 ==
OSF/2, a successor to OSF/1, was described as being based on the TMach system developed by Trusted Information Systems. TMach, or Trusted Mach, was an operating system architecture incorporating the OSF Mach MK++ kernel, introducing a trusted computing base layer consisting of trusted server components, hosting an application layer in which untrusted programs would run. In 1989, HP announced plans to merge the software platforms of its own products and those of newly acquired Apollo Computer to form a single OSF/2-compliant platform to be delivered by 1992.

Other interpretations of the OSF/2 name were associated with various plans to remove AT&T-licensed code from early forms of OSF/1 and the Mach kernel in particular, leading to speculation that a system based on the Chorus microkernel might supplant Mach entirely and become OSF/2 itself. With such a Chorus-based architecture having been rejected in favour of the Mach 3.0 microkernel, the OSF/2 designation persisted in reporting of this particular form of OSF/1.
