= Cluster-aware application =

Software application to call cluster APIs

A cluster-aware application is a software application designed to call cluster APIs in order to determine its running state, in case a manual failover is triggered between cluster nodes for planned technical maintenance, or an automatic failover is required, if a computing cluster node encounters hardware or software failure, to maintain business continuity. A cluster-aware application may be capable of failing over LAN or WAN.

== Cluster-aware application characteristics ==
- Use TCP/IP to maintain heartbeat between nodes.
- Capable of transaction processing.
- Mirroring cluster information in realtime.

== See also ==
- Cluster (computing)
