= UnixWare NonStop Clusters =

NonStop Clusters (NSC) was an add-on package for SCO UnixWare that allowed creation of fault-tolerant single-system image clusters of machines running UnixWare. NSC was one of the first commercially available highly available clustering solutions for commodity hardware.

== Description ==
NSC provided a full single-system image cluster:

Process migration
Processes started on any node in the cluster could be migrated to any other node. Migration could be either manual or automatic (for load balancing).
Single process space
All processes were visible from all nodes in the cluster. The standard Unix process management commands (ps, kill and so on) were used for process management.
Single root
All files and directories were available from all nodes of the cluster.
Single I/O space
All I/O devices were available from any node in the cluster. The normal device naming convention was modified to add a node number to all device names. For example, the second serial port on node 3 would be /dev/tty01h.3. A partition on a SCSI disk on node 2 might be /dev/rdsk/n2c3b0t4d0s3.
Single IPC space
The standard UnixWare IPC mechanisms (shared memory, semaphores, message queues, Unix domain sockets) were all available for communication between processes running on any node.
Cluster virtual IP address
NSC provided a single IP address for access to the cluster from other systems. Incoming connections were load-balanced between the available cluster nodes.

The NSC system was designed for high availability—all system services were either redundant or would fail-over from one node to another in the advent of a node crash. The disk subsystem was either accessible from multiple nodes (using a Fibre Channel SAN or dual-ported SCSI) or used cross-node mirroring in a similar fashion to DRBD.

== History ==
NSC was developed for Tandem Computers by Locus Computing Corporation based on their Transparent Network Computing technology. During the lifetime of the project Locus were acquired by Platinum Technology Inc. The NSC team and product were then transferred to Tandem.

Initially NSC was developed for the Compaq Integrity XC packaged cluster, consisting of between two and six Compaq ProLiant servers and one or two Compaq ServerNet switches to provide the cluster interconnect inter-node communication path. In this form NSC was commercialized by the Tandem Computers division of Compaq and only supported on qualified hardware from Compaq, and later Fujitsu-Siemens.

In 2000, NSC was modified to allow standard Fast Ethernet and later Gigabit Ethernet switches as the cluster interconnect and commercialized by SCO as UnixWare NonStop Clusters 7.1.1+IP. This release of NSC was available on commodity PC hardware, although SCO recommended that systems with more than two nodes used the ServerNet interconnect.

After the sale of the SCO Unix business to Caldera Systems, it was announced that the long-term goal was to integrate the NSC product into the base UnixWare code but this was not to be, Caldera Systems ceased distribution of NSC, replacing it by the Reliant HA clustering solution and in May 2001 Compaq announced that it would release a GPLed version of the NSC code, which eventually became OpenSSI.
