= TreadMarks =

TreadMarks is a distributed shared memory system created at Rice University in the 1990s.
