= Quantian =

- Developer: Dirk Eddelbuettel
- OS family: Linux (Unix-like)
- Working state: Current
- Source model: Open source
- Latest release: 7.9.2 / March 1, 2006
- Official website: Quantian Home Page

Quantian OS was a remastering of Knoppix/Debian for computational sciences. The environment was self-configuring and directly bootable CD/DVD that turns any PC or laptop (provided it can boot from cdrom/DVD) into a Linux workstation. Quantian also incorporated clusterKnoppix and added support for openMosix, including remote booting of light clients in an openMosix terminal server context permitting rapid setup of a SMP cluster computer.

== Applications ==
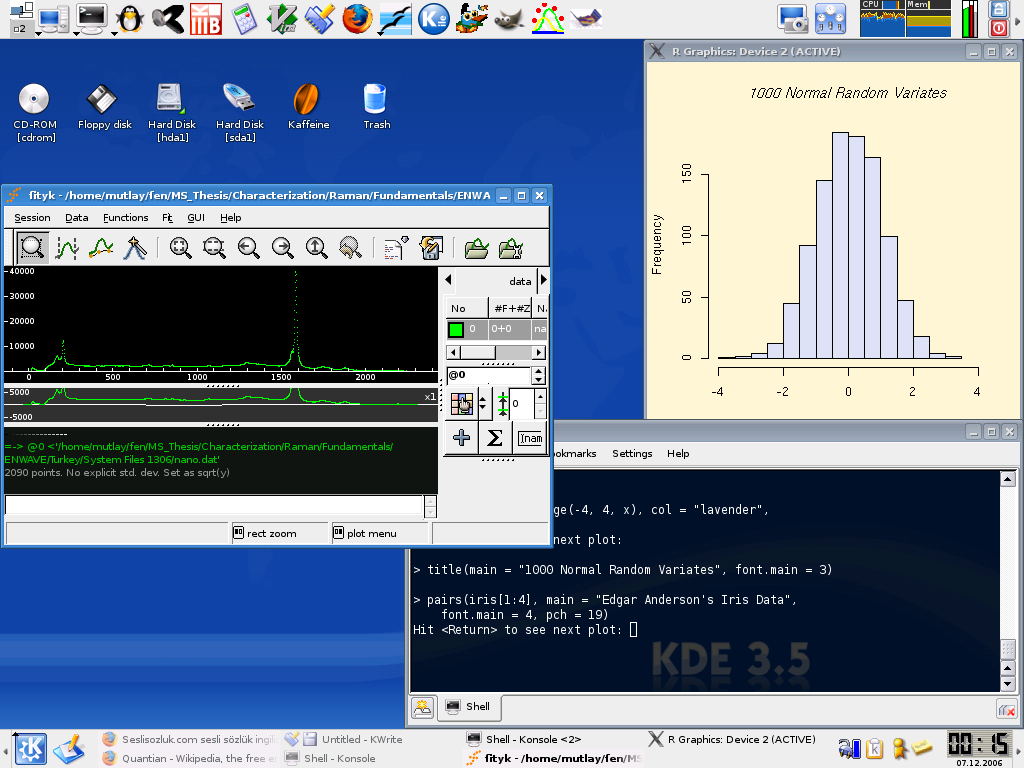
Some scientific applications in Quantian

Numerous software packages for general or scientific aims come with Quantian. After the installation, total package volume is about 2.7 GB.

The packages for "home users" include:

- KDE, the default desktop environment and their components
- XMMS, Kaffeine, xine media players
- Internet access software, including the KPPP dialer, ISDN utilities and WLAN
- The Mozilla, Mozilla Firefox and Konqueror web browsers
- K3b, for CD (and DVD) management
- The GIMP, an image-manipulation program
- Tools for data rescue and system repair
- Network analysis and administration tools
- OpenOffice.org
- Kile, Lyx

Additionally, some of the scientific applications/programs in Quantian are such like:

- R, statistical computing software
- Octave, a Matlab clone
- Scilab, another Matlab clone
- GSL, GNU Scientific Library
- Maxima computer algebra system
- Python programming language with Scipy
- Fityk curve fitter
- Ghemical for computational chemistry
- Texmacs for wysiwyg scientific editing
- Grass geographic information system
- OpenDX and MayaVi data visualisation systems
- Gnuplot, a command-line driven interactive data and function plotting utility
- LabPlot, an application for plotting of data sets and functions
