= TruCluster =

High-availability clustering solution

TruCluster is a closed-source high-availability clustering solution for the Tru64 UNIX operating system. It was originally developed by Digital Equipment Corporation (DEC), but was transferred to Compaq in 1998 when Digital was acquired by the company, which then later merged with Hewlett-Packard (HP).
