= Process migration =

Management process in computing

In computing, process migration is a specialized form of process management whereby processes are moved from one computing environment to another. This originated in distributed computing, but is now used more widely. On multicore machines (multiple cores on one processor or multiple processors) process migration happens as a standard part of process scheduling, and it is quite easy to migrate a process within a given machine, since most resources (memory, files, sockets) do not need to be changed, only the execution context (primarily program counter and registers).

The traditional form of process migration is in computer clusters where processes are moved from machine to machine, which is significantly more difficult, as it requires serializing the process image and migrating or reacquiring resources at the new machine. The first implementation of process migration was in the DEMOS/MP operating project at the University of California, Berkeley and was described in a 1983 paper by Barton Miller and Michael Powell. Process migration is implemented in, among others, OpenMosix and the Sprite OS from the University of California, Berkeley.

== Varieties ==
Process migration in computing comes in two flavors:

Non-preemptive process migration
Process migration that takes place before execution of the process starts (i.e. migration whereby a process need not be preempted). This type of process migration is relatively cheap, since relatively little administrative overhead is involved.
Preemptive process migration
Process migration whereby a process is preempted, migrated and continues processing in a different execution environment. This type of process migration is relatively expensive, since it involves recording, migration and recreation of the process state as well as the reconstructing of any inter-process communication channels to which the migrating process is connected.

== Problems ==
Several problems occur when a running process moves to another machine. Some of these problems are:

I/O redirection: if a process does I/O to files or devices that are bound to a certain machine, there must be a way to redirect access to these resources even after the process migrated. This involves redirection of the I/O data stream over the network and has disadvantages concerning security, performance and reliability.

Inter-process communication: messages sent to a process with process ID P on a machine M have to be redirected to the new machine N and the new process ID Q. The machine the process migrated away from needs to keep records of migrated processes. If multiple migration occurs, the overhead increases.

Shared memory: if one of a group of cooperating processes migrates away and all these processes use a shared memory segment, then the network must be used to emulate shared memory access. This adds complexity and slows down access to the shared memory dramatically for processes that migrated away from the machine holding the shared memory. The phenomena that a host computer must provide services to a process that migrated away is called Residual Dependency.

In addition to the problems mentioned above, process based operating systems usually maintain a variety of tables and states for running processes. There is no simple way to retrieve all administrative information about a process in a simple sequence of copy operations. Depending on the execution of the process, tables need to be searched, copied, altered and re-established on the destination system. Thus, process state replication is no simple task.

Reference http://www.klammeraffe.org/~fritsch/uni-sb/fsinfo/Papers/migrate/node4.html

== Integrated circuit design ==
An alternate definition of process migration is used in integrated circuit design and engineering. Process migration or layout migration in this context is a design flow to change and shrink an existing IC layout to a new process technology node. The implementation of a process migration could be done manually by redrawing the layout feature by feature or by automatic EDA/CAD tools. In load sharing systems, a process is migrated from one node to another using a mechanism called process migration.

The concept of a process is not introduced in this report as processes are a well-known design in operating systems. Process Migration refers to the mobility of executing (or suspended) processes in a distributed computing environment. Usually, this term indicates that a process uses a network to migrate to another machine to continue its execution there. Sometimes the term is used to describe the change in execution from one processor to another processor within the same machine.
