= Tru64 UNIX =

Computer operating system

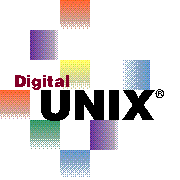
- Developer: DEC, HP, IBM, Compaq
- OS family: Unix, OSF/1
- Working state: Retired (support ended December 2012)
- Source model: Closed source
- Initial release: January 1992; 34 years ago
- Latest release: 5.1B-6 / October 1, 2010; 16 years ago
- Supported platforms: DEC Alpha
- Kernel type: Hybrid kernel
- Userland: POSIX
- Default user interface: Command-line interface
- License: Proprietary
- Official website: Tru64 UNIX Software

Tru64 UNIX is a discontinued 64-bit UNIX operating system for the Alpha instruction set architecture (ISA), currently owned by Hewlett-Packard (HP). Previously, Tru64 UNIX was a product of Compaq, and before that, Digital Equipment Corporation (DEC), where it was known as Digital UNIX (originally DEC OSF/1 AXP).

As its original name suggests, Tru64 UNIX is based on the OSF/1 operating system. DEC's previous UNIX product was known as Ultrix and was based on BSD.

It is unusual among commercial UNIX implementations, as it is built on top of the Mach kernel developed at Carnegie Mellon University. (Other UNIX and UNIX-like implementations built on top of the Mach kernel are GNU Hurd, NeXTSTEP, MkLinux, and Darwin.)

Tru64 UNIX required the SRM boot firmware found on Alpha-based computer systems.

== DEC OSF/1 AXP ==
In 1988, Digital Equipment Corporation (DEC) joined with IBM, Hewlett-Packard, and others to form the Open Software Foundation (OSF). A primary aim was to develop a version of Unix, named OSF/1, to compete with System V Release 4 from AT&T Corporation and Sun Microsystems. After DEC's first release (OSF/1 Release 1.0) in January 1992 for their line of MIPS-based DECstation workstations, DEC ported OSF/1 to their new Alpha AXP platform (as DEC OSF/1 AXP), and this was the first version (Release 1.2) of what is most commonly referred to as OSF/1. DEC OSF/1 AXP Release 1.2 was shipped in March 1993. OSF/1 AXP was a full 64-bit operating system and the native UNIX implementation for the Alpha architecture. After OSF/1 AXP V2.0 onwards, UNIX System V compatibility was also integrated into the system.

== Digital UNIX ==
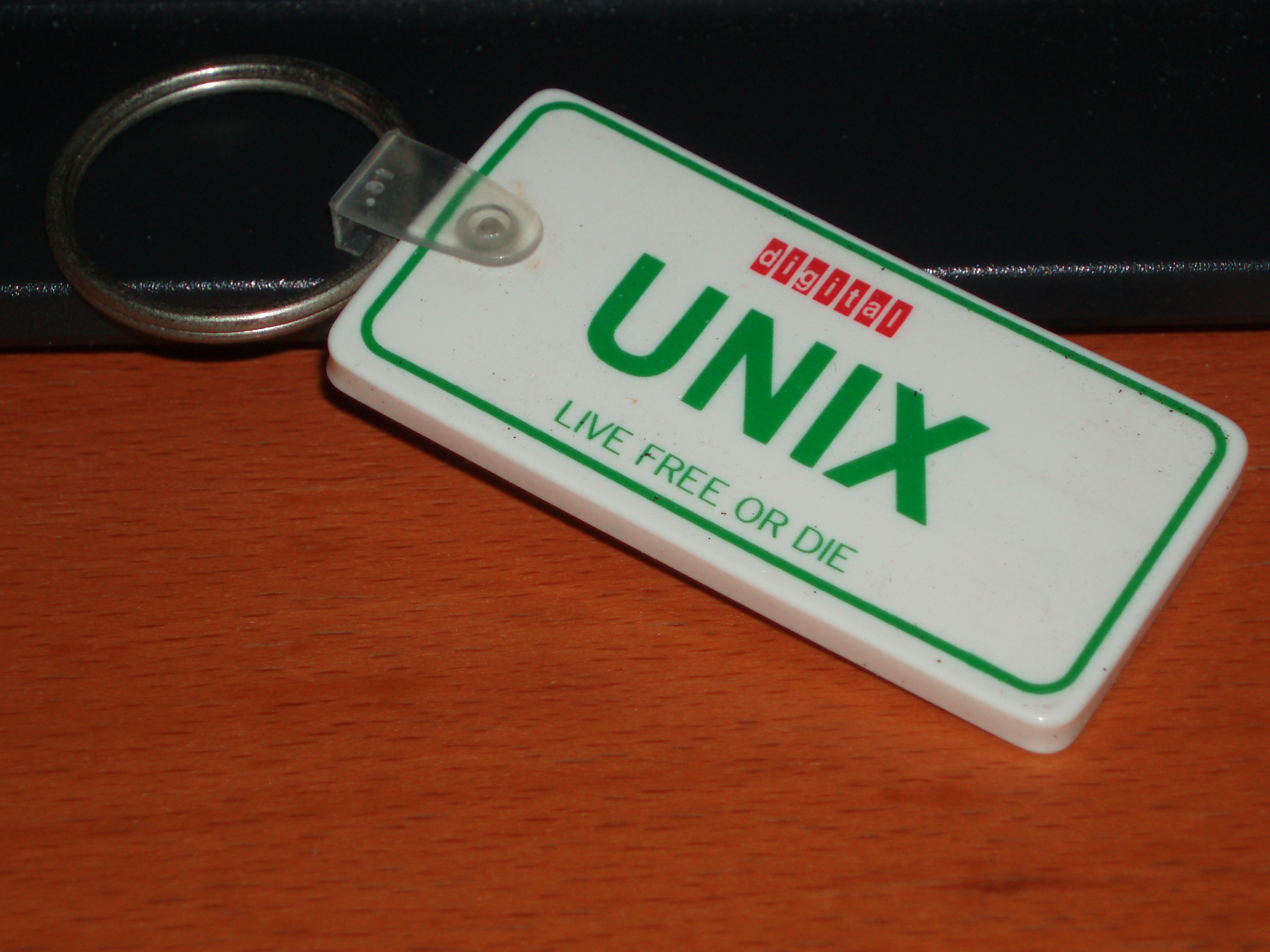
A Digital UNIX key chain. The other side reads, "CALIFORNIA - Y W8 4 HP ["Why wait for HP"] - The Migration State"

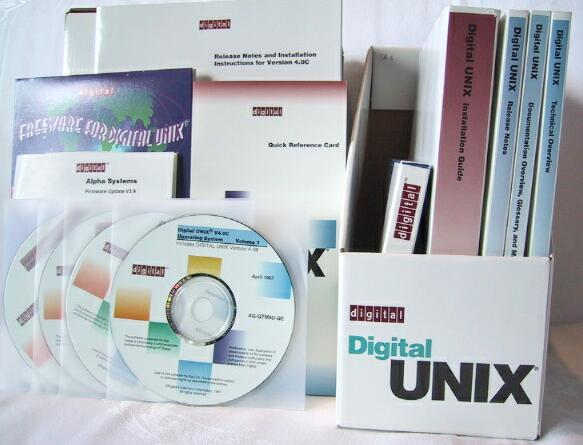
Digital Unix distribution media

In 1995, starting with release 3.2, DEC renamed OSF/1 AXP to Digital UNIX to reflect its conformance with the X/Open Single UNIX Specification.

== Tru64 UNIX ==
After Compaq's purchase of DEC in early 1998, with the release of version 4.0F, Digital UNIX was renamed to Tru64 UNIX to emphasise its 64-bit-clean nature and de-emphasise the Digital brand.

In April 1999, Compaq announced that Tru64 UNIX 5.0 successfully ran on Intel's IA-64 simulator. However, this port was cancelled a few months later.

A Chinese version of Tru64 UNIX named COSIX was jointly developed by Compaq and China National Computer Software & Technology Service Corporation (CS&S). It was released in 1999.

== TruCluster Server ==
From release V5.0 Tru64 UNIX offered a clustering facility named TruCluster Server. TruCluster utilised a cluster-wide filesystem visible to each cluster member, plus member specific storage and an optional quorum disk. Member specific files paths were enhanced symbolic links incorporating the member id of the owning member. Each member had one or zero votes, which, combined with a possible quorum disk, implemented a cluster formation algorithm similar to that found in OpenVMS.

== End of Life ==
With their purchase of Compaq in 2002, HP announced their intention to migrate many of Tru64 UNIX's more innovative features (including its AdvFS, TruCluster, and LSM) to HP-UX. In December 2004, HP announced a change of plan: they would instead use the Veritas File System and abandon the Tru64 advanced features. In the process, many of the remaining Tru64 developers were laid off.

The last maintenance release, 5.1B-6 was released in October 2010.

In October 2010, HP stated that they would continue to support Tru64 UNIX until 31 December 2012.

In 2008, HP contributed the AdvFS filesystem to the open-source community.

== Versions ==
These versions were released for Alpha AXP platforms.

Version	Approx Date	Notes
DEC OSF/1 1.2	March 1993	
DEC OSF/1 1.2A	April 1993	Hardware only release
DEC OSF/1 1.3	July 1993	
DEC OSF/1 1.3A	September 1993	
DEC OSF/1 1.3B	November 1993	Hardware only release
DEC OSF/1 2.0	March 1994	
DEC OSF/1 2.0A	April 1994	Logical Storage Manager (LSM) v1; AdvFS v1; ASE v1 introduced
DEC OSF/1 2.0B	May 1994	Hardware only release
DEC OSF/1 2.1	July 1994	
DEC OSF/1 3.0	August 1994	SMP support
DEC OSF/1 3.0A	September 1994	ASE v1.1; System V Environment
DEC OSF/1 3.0B	September 1994	Hardware only release
Digital UNIX 3.2	February 1995	
Digital UNIX 3.2A	March 1995	ASE v1.2
Digital UNIX 3.2B	May 1995	Hardware only release
Digital UNIX 3.2C	July 1995	
Digital UNIX 3.2D-1	January 1996	ASE v1.3
Digital UNIX 3.2D-2	January 1996	Hardware only release
Digital UNIX 3.2E	March 1996	TruCluster v1.0
Digital UNIX 4.0	March 1996	CDE made default desktop
Digital UNIX 3.2F	June 1996	
Digital UNIX 3.2G	August 1996	
Digital UNIX 4.0A	September 1996	ASE v1.4
Digital UNIX 4.0B	December 1996	X/Open-compliant Curses
Digital UNIX 4.0C	April 1997	
Digital UNIX 4.0D	December 1997	Y2K readiness; extended UIDs/GIDs; class scheduler; JDK 1.1.4; Netscape 3.04
Digital UNIX 4.0E	November 1998	ASE v1.5; USB support; AdvFS atomic write data logging; Sendmail 8.8.8; ODBC/JDBC; Netscape 4.05
Tru64 UNIX 4.0F	April 1999	USB keyboard/mouse support; limited DVD support; Netscape 4.5; COM for Tru64 UNIX
Tru64 UNIX 5.0	July 1999	Improved performance/scalability; Hot-swap; Sendmail 8.8.8; OpenMP; Netscape 4.51; X11R6.3
Tru64 UNIX 5.0A	April 2000	UFS Delayed metadata option; Sendmail 8.9.3; Netscape 4.7; ISO 9660 install disc
Tru64 UNIX 4.0G	May 2000	Maximum 256 X clients (formerly 128); Netscape 4.7
Tru64 UNIX 5.1	September 2000	Extended System V functionality; Tcl/Tk 8.2; IPv6
Tru64 UNIX 5.1A	September 2001	Online CPU addition/removal; UNIX 98 Conformance; X11R6.5; Netscape 4.76
Tru64 UNIX 5.1B	September 2002	Big Pages; IPv6 Enhancements; Netscape 6; Unicode 3.1
Tru64 UNIX 5.1B-1	November 2003	Name Service Switch (NSS); Mozilla 1.4
Tru64 UNIX 5.1B-2	August 2004	Unified Buffer Cache Scaling; Perl 5.8.4; Mozilla 1.6
Tru64 UNIX 5.1B-3	June 2005	AdvFS robustness; Accounting refinements; LSM enhancements; Mozilla 1.7.5
Tru64 UNIX 5.1B-4	December 2006	POSIX conformance; Rebranding (COMPAQ to HP); 2007 U.S. DST changes; BIND 9.2.5
Tru64 UNIX 5.1B-5	March 2009	Standards conformance; Support for latest DST changes; BIND 9.2.8
Tru64 UNIX 5.1B-6	October 2010	Defect fixes only. Support ended 31 Dec 2012
