= Gigabit Seattle =

Gigabit Seattle was a fiber-to-the-home / fiber-to-the-business network planned to be deployed in Seattle, Washington. The network comes out of a partnership between the City of Seattle, the University of Washington and digital economic development company Gigabit Squared to deploy a next generation network in the city. The project is the second city project announced by Gigabit Squared as part of its Gigabit Neighborhood Gateway Program, after Gigabit Chicago.

== Background ==
Since 2004, leadership in the City of Seattle pursued affordable, Internet access for residents and businesses with the hope of using a city-sponsored network. The City abandoned one effort in July 2012, and pursued a new strategy – leasing excess capacity on the city-owned fiber to private providers. On October 2, 2012, the City of Seattle issued a Request for Interest to use excess capacity in the city's fiber optic network.

On December 13, 2012, at an event at the Paul G. Allen Center for Computer Science & Engineering at the University of Washington, Mayor Michael McGinn and Gigabit Squared President Mark Ansboury announced the Gigabit Seattle project.

Currently this project is considered to be dead.

== Components of the project ==
The project is made up of three parts: fiber-to-the-home and fiber-to-the-business, a dedicated gigabit to multi-family housing and offices and next-generation wireless cloud services in 12 neighborhoods throughout the city. Gigabit Seattle plans to build out a fiber-to-the-home/fiber-to-the-business network to more than 50,000 households and businesses in 14 demonstration neighborhoods, connected together with excess capacity that Gigabit Seattle will lease from the city's own fiber network. To provide coverage beyond the 14 demonstration neighborhoods, Gigabit Seattle intends to build a dedicated gigabit broadband wireless umbrella to cover Seattle providing point-to-point radio access up to one gigabit per second, achieved by placing fiber transmitters on top of 38 buildings across Seattle. These transmitters can beam fiber internet to multi-family housing and offices across Seattle, even those outside the twelve demonstration neighborhoods, as long as they are in a line of sight. Internet service would be delivered to individual units within a building through existing wiring. This wireless coverage can provide network and Internet services to customers that do not have immediate access to fiber in the city. Gigabit Seattle will provide next generation mobile, wireless cloud services in its 14 neighborhoods.

== Deployment and services ==
Gigabit Squared had planned to begin engineering the network in the first quarter of 2013. Pricing and service offerings were not announced, but it has been indicated they would have been competitive with current broadband service offerings in terms of price, though speeds would have likely been faster.

The Gigabit Seattle network was going to be rolled out initially to 14 demonstration neighborhoods:

- Area 1: The University’s West Campus District
- Area 2: South Lake Union
- Area 3: First Hill/Capitol Hill/Central Area
- Area 4: The University’s Metropolitan Tract
- Area 5: The University’s Family Housing at Sand Point
- Area 6: Northgate
- Area 7: Volunteer Park Area
- Area 8: Beacon Hill and SODO Light Rail Station
- Area 9: Mount Baker
- Area 10: Columbia City
- Area 11: Othello
- Area 12: Rainier Beach
- Area 13: Central Ballard
- Area 14: West Seattle

== Partnership ==
Gigabit Seattle will own and operate the fiber network and broadband wireless services. The City and The University of Washington will not be asked to invest in the project, and will not have any ownership share. The city's Department of Information Technology, will coordinate the activities of City departments, coordinate the efforts of other public agencies for the purpose of and facilitate lease agreements for City-owned excess fiber.

The University of Washington will provide community leadership and collaborate with Gigabit Seattle on public uses of the next generation network, piloting health care and education applications.
