= Stettner =

Stettner is a surname. Notable people with the surname include:

- Armando Stettner, American computer engineer and architect
- Dirk Stettner (born 1969), German entrepreneur and politician
- Louis Stettner (1922–2016), American photographer
- Łukasz Stettner (born 1955), Polish mathematician
- Patrick Stettner, American film director and writer
- Willy Stettner (1895–1961), German singer and actor
