= NCR 53C9x =

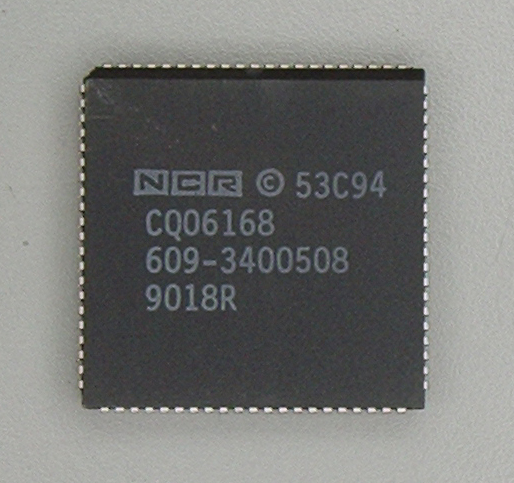
NCR 53C94 SCSI-1 controller in PLCC-84 package.

The NCR 53C9x is a family of application-specific integrated circuits (ASIC) produced by the former NCR Corporation and others for implementing the SCSI (small computer standard interface) bus protocol in hardware and relieving the host system of the work required to sequence the SCSI bus. The 53C9x was a low-cost solution and was therefore widely adopted by OEMs in various motherboard and peripheral device designs. The original 53C90 lacked direct memory access (DMA) capability, an omission that was addressed in the 53C90A and subsequent versions.

The 53C90(A) and later 53C94 supported the ANSI X3.l3I-1986 SCSI-1 protocol, implementing the eight bit parallel SCSI bus and eight bit host data bus transfers. The 53CF94 and 53CF96 added SCSI-2 support and implemented larger transfer sizes per SCSI transaction. Additionally, the 53CF96 could be interfaced to a single-ended bus or a high voltage differential (HVD) bus, the latter which supported long bus cables. All members of the 53C94/96 type support both eight and 16 bit host bus transfers via programmed input/output (PIO) and DMA.

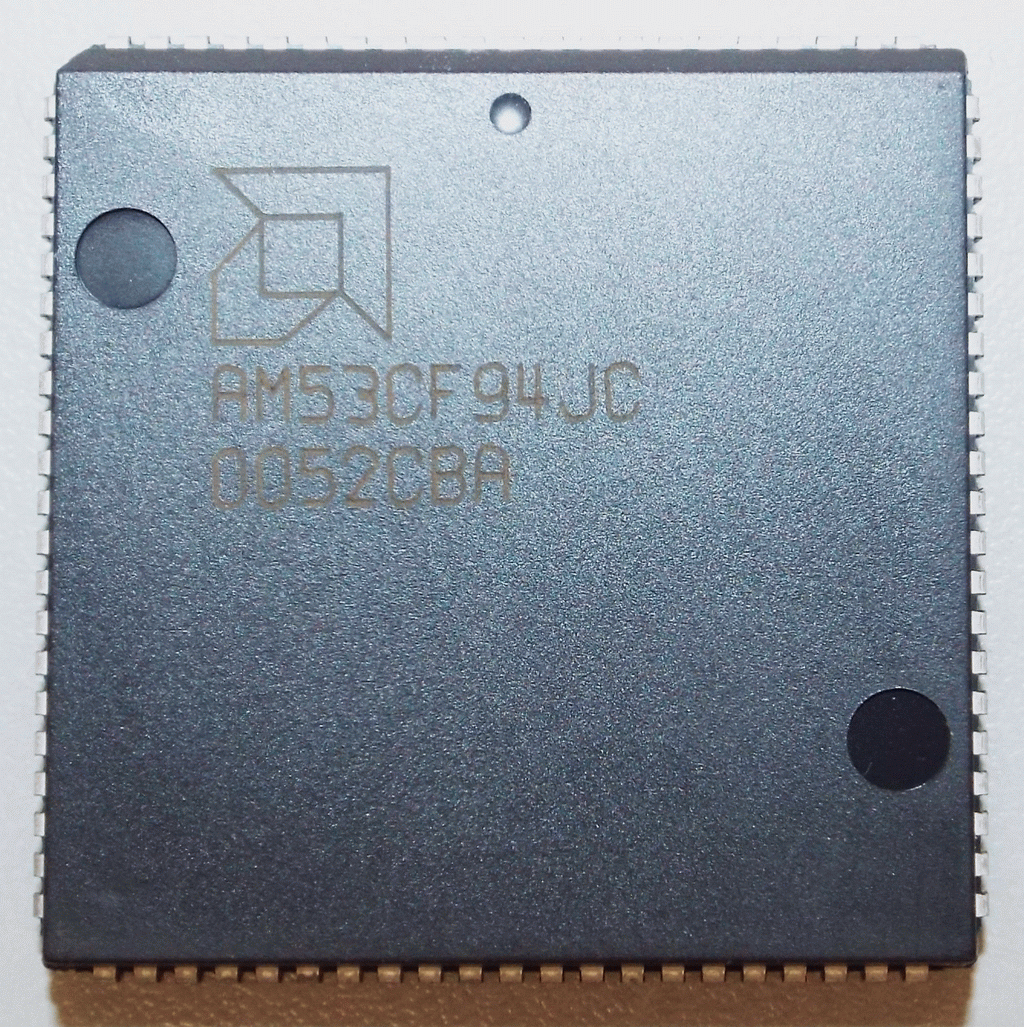
AMD 53CF94 SCSI-2 controller in PLCC-84 package.

QLogic FAS216 and Emulex ESP100 chips are a drop-in replacement for the NCR 53C94. The 53C90A and 53C(F)94/96 were also produced under license by Advanced Micro Devices (AMD).

A list of systems which included the 53C9x controller includes:

53C90A

- Sony PlayStation (console) Prototype (PS-X DTL-H500)
- NeXT NeXTstation (25MHz)

53C94

- Sun Microsystems SPARCstations and the SPARCclassic
- DEC 3000 AXP
- DECstations and the PMAZ-A TURBOchannel card
- VAXstation model 60, 4000-m90
- MIPS Magnum
- Power Macintosh G3; often used as a secondary SCSI controller with MESH (Macintosh Enhanced SCSI Hardware) as the primary
- MacroSystem's Evolution family for Amiga (FAS216)

53C96

- Macintosh Quadra 650
- Macintosh LC475/Quadra 605/Performa 475
- Macintosh Quadra 700
- Macintosh Quadra 900 and 950

== See also ==
- NCR 5380
