= DECsystem =

Series of server computers

DECsystem was a line of server computers from Digital Equipment Corporation. They were based on MIPS architecture processors and ran DEC's version of the UNIX operating system, called ULTRIX. They ranged in size from workstation-style desktop enclosures to large pedestal cabinets.

The DECSYSTEM name was used for later models of the PDP-10, namely the DECSYSTEM-10 and DECSYSTEM-20 series.

== Models ==
=== DECsystem 3100 ===
Identical to the DECstation 3100, but intended as a multiuser system. It was announced in early May 1989 at the UniForum exhibition in San Francisco. It was shipped in June 1989. Code name PMAX.

=== DECsystem 5000 Series ===
Rebranded Personal DECstation 5000 Series without graphics. Code name MAXINE.

=== DECsystem 5000 Model 100 Series ===
Rebranded DECstation 5000 Model 100 Series without graphics. Codename 3MIN.

=== DECsystem 5000 Model 200 Series ===
Rebranded DECstation 5000 Model 200 Series without graphics. Code name 3MAX. (5000/260 3MAX+).

=== DECsystem 5100 ===
A desktop uniprocessor entry-level server. It replaced the DECsystem 3100. Code name MIPSMATE.

=== DECsystem 5400 ===
A pedestal uniprocessor system based on the Q-Bus. It shared many hardware options with the 3x00-series MAYFAIR VAXes, including TK70 tape drive, MS650-BA memory and DSSI disk drives. SCSI was not available except with third party add-in hardware. The unit shipped with a MicroVAX diagnostic processor, which ran similar ROM diagnostics to the MicroVAX series, as well as boot the tape based MicroVAX Diagnostic TK70 tape. Once the console transferred control of the computer to the MIPS processor the MicroVAX sat essentially unused until the next boot. Code name MIPSFAIR.

=== DECsystem 5500 ===
A pedestal uniprocessor system based on the Q-Bus. It replaced the DECsystem 5400. The 5500 came with native SCSI support, as well as support for DSSI disk drives. Code name MIPSFAIR-2.

The DECsystem 5500 shipped in a BA430 enclosure, which provided a 12-slot backplane and room for four mass storage devices. The base system contained the following:

- A KN220-AA module set. This consists of a KN220 I/O module in slot 1 and a KN220 CPU module in slot 2.
- The CPU module contained a 30 MHz R3000 CPU with R3010 FPU; a 512 KB of Prestoserve (NFS accelerator) battery-backed RAM.
- The I/O module contained a Q22-bus interface; SGEC Second Generation Ethernet Controller; a DSSI Digital Storage System Interconnect port; a SII-based SCSI port.
- 1 to 4 MS220-AA 32 MB memory modules, installed in slots 3 through 7.

=== DECsystem 5800 Series ===
The DECsystem 5800 Series are high-end multiprocessor systems. The series comprised the DECsystem 5810, 5820, 5830, and 5840, with the third digit referring to the number of processors. These systems were the MIPS/RISC alternatives of the VAX 6000 operating the XMI and BI bus. The 5810 and 5820, using 25 MHz R3000 microprocessors and R3010 floating-point coprocessors, were introduced on 11 July 1989. Code name ISIS.

=== DECsystem 5900 and DECsystem 5900/260 ===
The DECsystem 5900 and DECsystem 5900/260 were rack-mounted DECstation 5000 Model 240 and DECstation Model 260 workstations, respectively, positioned as mid-range servers. The DECsystem 5900 was introduced in early December 1991. Both models were discontinued on 28 January 1994. Their intended replacement was the DEC 3000 Model 800S AXP packaged in a similar rack-mountable enclosure.

The DECstation system module is repackaged in a CPU drawer, mounted in a rack that permits the drawer to slide in and out. The CPU module contained an integrated TURBOchannel Extender, the power supply and a blower, which cooled the system. However, as the system module that these systems use does not feature multiprocessing capabilities, the presence of two CPU drawers in a rack amounted to two separate systems. The mass storage drawers, in such a case, would be divided between the CPU drawers, with a minimum of one per a CPU drawer.

It included two models of mass storage drawers. One model may contain one to four 5.25-inch full-height non-removable, one 5.25-inch full-height removable or non-removable and two 5.25-inch half-height removable devices. The other model may contain one to five 5.25-inch full-height non-removable, one 5.25-inch removable and two 5.25-inch half-height removable devices. In both models, a 400 W power supply sat at the rear of the drawer.

The H9A00 enclosure, a 19-inch rack, contained a minimum of one CPU drawer and one mass storage drawer. A power controller at the bottom of the enclosure distributed power to the CPU and mass storage drawers. The rack could contain a maximum of two CPU drawers and four mass storage drawers.

The DECsystem 5900 had a width of 61 cm (24 in), a height of 170 cm (67 in), a depth of 86.4 cm (34.0 in) and a weight of 265 to 485 kg (584 to 1,069 lb) depending on the configuration.

== See also ==
- DECstation
- PDP-10
