= NCR 5380 =

SCSI controller

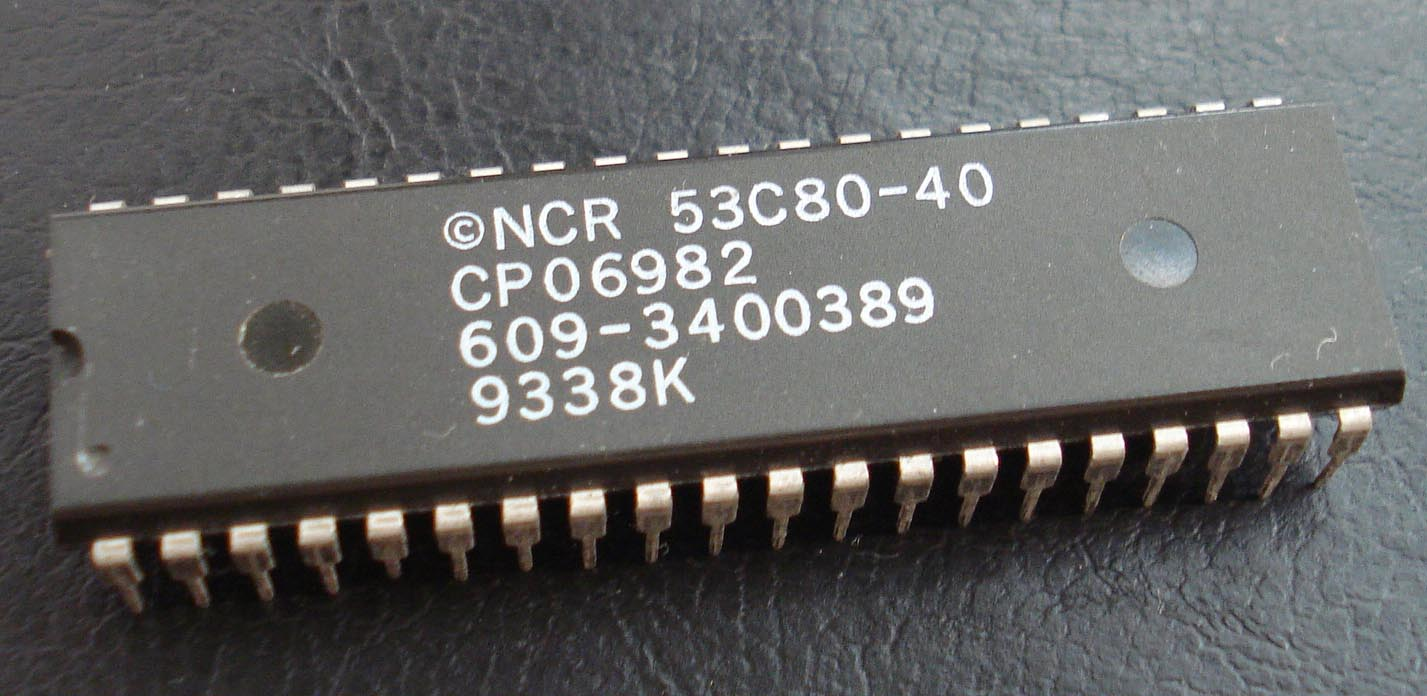
NCR 53c80 SCSI controller

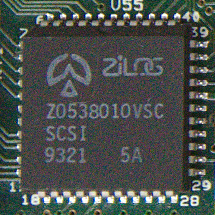
Zilog 5380 on a Media Vision Pro AudioSpectrum with SCSI interface

The NCR 5380 is an early SCSI controller chip developed by NCR Microelectronics. It was popular due to its simplicity and low cost. The 5380 was used in the Macintosh Plus and in numerous SCSI cards for personal computers, including the Amiga and Atari TT. The 5380 was second sourceed by several chip makers, including AMD and Zilog. The 5380 was designed by engineers at the NCR plant then located in Wichita, Kansas, and initially fabricated by NCR Microelectronics in Colorado Springs, Colorado. It was the first single-chip implementation of the SCSI-1 protocol.

The NCR 5380 also made a significant appearance in Digital Equipment Corporation's VAX computers, where it was featured on various Q-Bus modules and as an integrated SCSI controller in numerous MicroVAX, VAXstation and VAXserver computers. Many UMAX SCSI optical scanners also contain the 53C80 chip interfaced to an Intel 8031-series microcontroller.

Single-chip SCSI controller NCR 53c400 used SCSI 5380 core.

== See also ==
- NCR 53C9x
