= Digital Storage Systems Interconnect =

Computer bus used on VAX computers

The Digital Storage Systems Interconnect (DSSI) is a computer bus developed by Digital Equipment Corporation for connecting storage devices and clustering VAX systems. It was designed as a smaller and lower-cost replacement for the earlier DEC Computer Interconnect that would be more suitable for use in office environments. DSSI was superseded by Parallel SCSI.

It was introduced in 1988 and has a bandwidth of 32 Mbit/s (4 MB/sec) and was typically limited to a length of 25 metres (82 ft). DSSI support was later extended to MIPS-based DECsystems and DEC Alpha-based AlphaServer systems.

DSSI peripherals could be distinguished from narrow SCSI devices by their characteristic five-conductor power connector featuring an extra lead intended for Battery/UPS connection to power critical components in the event of a power failure.

== Characteristics ==
The major characteristics of the DSSI bus are:

- Eight-bit data path
- Up to eight nodes on the bus including variable numbers of initiators and targets
- Distributed arbitration
- Peak bandwidth of 4 megabytes per second
- All systems connected to the same DSSI bus must have a common power/ground.
- "The Q-Bus 5-Enclosure Rule": For Q-bus VMScluster configurations, a maximum of five enclosures, excluding SF200/210s, can be configured on a single DSSI bus. Note that only one (1) SF100 is allowed on any DSSI bus.
- "The VAX 6000 Cabinet Rule": For a VAX 6000 DSSI VMScluster system, a maximum of two or three VAX 6000 systems and one storage cabinet, typically an SF200 or SF210, can be configured on a single DSSI bus.
- Maximum DSSI bus length cannot exceed 27 meters (89 feet) and ground offset voltage cannot exceed 30mv (dc) or 10.5mv (rms).

                                 Bus Length      Allowable Offset
                           Meters/Feet  (DC) (AC)
                           -----------     ----------------
                           up to 20/65     200mv   70mv (rms)
                           20-25/65-82      40mv   14mv (rms)
           VAX6000 QUAD-Host--> 27/89      30mv   10.5mv (rms)
           VAX7000
           VAX10000

== Operating system support in VAX/OpenVMS ==
  DSSI SUPPORT IN OpenVMS:
   OpenVMS VAX V5.0-2:
     o  Single- and Dual-Host support with 2 EDA640s (MicroVAX 3300/3400
        series).
     o  Systems Communications Services (SCS) for the VMScluster is run
       over the Network Interconnect (NI) for MicroVAX 3300/3400.
   OpenVMS VAX V5.1:
     o  Standalone support for the KFQSA.
     o  Up to 6 ISEs on a single DSSI bus regardless of whether 1 or 2
        hosts systems are attached to the bus.
   OpenVMS VAX V5.1-1:
     o  Dual host support for KFQSAs (1 KFQSA per system).
   OpenVMS VAX V5.2:
     o  For 3300/3400 series, SCS communication over the DSSI.
     o  Multiple KFQSA's per system, but *not* multiple dual-hosted
        DSSI's per system (here, multiple means 2, since only 2 hosts
        are allowed on the DSSI bus).
     o  DSSI adapter must connect to another like adapter, e.g. EDA640
         to EDA640 or KFQSA to KFQSA.
     o  Up to 7 ISEs on a single DSSI bus when only 1 host system is
        attached to the bus.
   OpenVMS VAX V5.3:
    o  Mixed DSSI adapters, i.e. EDA640 to KFQSA.
    o  Mixed DSSI adapters, i.e. EDA640 to KFQSA.
     o  Double dual-host configurations, i.e. 2 DSSI buses between two
        CPUs. Each bus is terminated at its own pair of adapters.
   OpenVMS VAX V5.3-2:
     o  Support for VAX 4000. (The VAX 4000 has 2 SHACs and can support
        two KFQSAs on the bus, so it can have up to 4 DSSI buses).
   OpenVMS VAX V5.4-2:
     o  Support for the KFMSA, an XMI to DSSI adapter. The KFMSA may
        only be used to single-host a VAX 6000 model or dual-host 2 VAX
        6000 models together.
   OpenVMS VAX V5.4-3:
     o  Tri-host configurations supported.
   OpenVMS VAX V5.5-2:
     o  Quad-host configurations with VAX 6000, VAX 7000/10000
        series systems now supported.
        NOTE: KFQSAs do not support SCS communication over the DSSI bus,
               they MUST have a NI connection in order to run the cluster
               software.
   OpenVMS Alpha V1.5, OpenVMS VAX V6.0:
     o  Quad-host DSSI configurations with DEC 4000 AXP systems supported.
        DEC 4000 systems can be configured only as end nodes on a DSSI
        bus, therefore, quad-host configurations must include at least
        two VAX systems.
     o  KFQSA Q-bus to DSSI configurations supported.
        VAX processors that use the KFQSA adapter can be placed on the
        same DSSI bus as DEC 4000 processors.

== Third Party Peripherals ==
Other companies, such as CMD and Symbios Logic made DSSI compatible chipsets or peripherals, for example, CMD manufactured various models of the CDI-4000 which would allow SCSI peripherals to be used on a DSSI bus.

== See also ==
- DSSI VAXcluster Installation and Troubleshooting manual, EK-410AB-MG
- DEC Technical article: [ Ultrix ] How To Configure a kfqsa on a DECstation (sic) 5500 (DS5500), Last Technical Review: 6-SEP-1991 Size: 110 lines
- DEC Technical article: [OpenVMS] Configuring RF Drives Connected To DSSI Adapter In A Cluster, Last Technical Review: 8-OCT-1996 Size: 332 lines
- DEC Technical article: [OpenVMS] Guide To DSSI VAXcluster Configurations
- DEC Technical article: How To Initialize An RF72 For High Speed Mode
- DEC Technical article: [OpenVMS] Chart Overview Of Digital Disk Drive Storage Capacities
- DEC Technical article: [PERFORMANCE] Disk Drive Performance Specifications
- "OpenVMS Release Notes Addendum for VMScluster Systems", October 1993, (AA-Q1X7A-TE).
- "Dual-Host MicroVAX Systems", VAXcluster Systems Quorum, February 1990, (EC-P0623-57), pp. 3–31.
- "VAX 4000 Systems Info Sheet", (EC-F1424-41).
- "VAX 6000 Systems Info Sheet", (EC-F1417-46).
- "KFESA DSSI Adapter Installation and User's Guide", May 1994, EK-KFESA-OP.A01.
- CDI-4000 DSSI to SCSI Adapter User's Manual, MAN-004000-000
