= Mail-11 =

Mail-11 was the native email transport protocol used by Digital Equipment Corporation's VMS operating system, and supported by several other DEC operating systems such as Ultrix.

It normally used the DECnet networking system as opposed to TCP/IP.

Similar to Internet SMTP based mail, Mail-11 mail had To: Cc: and Subj: headers and date-stamped each message.

Mail-11 was one of the most widely used email systems of the 1980s, and was still in fairly wide use until as late as the mid-1990s. Messages from Mail-11 systems were frequently gatewayed out to SMTP, Usenet, and BITNET systems, and thus are sometimes encountered browsing archives of those systems dating from when Mail-11 was in common use.

Several very large DECnet networks with Mail-11 service existed, most notably ENET, which was DEC's worldwide internal network. Another big user was HEPnet, a network for the high-energy physics research community that linked many universities and research labs.

Mail-11 used two colons (::) rather than an at sign (@) to separate user and hostname, and hostname came first.

== Some example headers ==
- To: THEWAL::HARKAWIK

A message to user HARKAWIK on a machine or cluster of machines called THEWAL.

Note that under VMS, usernames were not case-sensitive and were usually shown in uppercase, but under Ultrix, usernames were case-sensitive, and most sites followed the unix convention of using lower case usernames. Names of machines on a DECnet network were not case-sensitive. Thus, the header above implies that the mail is going to a VMS system, but the one following implies the user is on a Unix system.

- To: DS5353::tabak

A message to user tabak on node DS5353. Probably an Ultrix system.

- From: GUESS::YERAZUNIS "it's.. it's DIP !" 21-SEP-1989 10:28:38.87
- To: DECWRL::"decvax!peregrine!dmi"
- CC: YERAZUNIS

This message was sent to the gateway at DEC's Western Research Labs, one of DEC's main Internet gateways. From there, it was expected to travel via uucp, from host decvax to host peregrine to user dmi.

Since the timestamp is present, this must be a copy of a message that has already been sent, but since the From address is still in Mail-11 form, the text above must be copied from the local CC of the message rather than from the version that went through the gateway.

Unlike SMTP mail, mail readers did not support automatic signatures; many users developed the habit of changing their personal name setting to be some interesting or amusing quotation.

- To: IN%"president@whitehouse.gov"

The message is to be gatewayed to another network, in this case to the Internet SMTP protocol, and then delivered to the user president at the domain whitehouse.gov

- To: HEPNET::TUHEP::SLIWA

The message has to go through two machines. First, it is given to the node HEPNET, which then passes the machine to the node TUHEP, where it is then delivered to the user SLIWA.

- From: "TGV::MCMAHON"@yoyodyne.com

Mail from user MCMAHON on a machine or cluster named TGV, that was passed out of an Internet SMTP gateway by yoyodyne.com. This is one form the header might take from the recipient's viewpoint.
