= Inmos G364 framebuffer =

The G364 framebuffer was a line of graphics adapters using the SGS Thomson INMOS G364 colour video controller, produced by INMOS (known for their transputer and eventually acquired by SGS Thomson and incorporated into STMicroelectronics) in the early 1990s. The G364 included a RAMDAC and a 64-bit interface to VRAM graphical memory to implement a framebuffer, but did not include any hardware-based graphical acceleration other than a hardware cursor function.

The G364 was largely similar in design and functionality to the G300 framebuffer, but had a 64-bit VRAM interface instead of the slower 32-bit interface of the lower-price G300.

The INMOS G364 is quite similar to the G332 found on the Personal DECstation and Dell PowerLine 450DE/2 DGX Graphics Workstation.

Although the G364 was capable of providing comparatively high resolution output (up to 1600×1200 pixels at 8 bits-per-pixel, in many cases) typically achieved only in Unix workstations such as those of Sun Microsystems or SGI, it was not a popular chipset for the personal computer manufacturers of the early 1990s and was not adopted by any major workstation manufacturers.

The G364 framebuffer was used in an after-market Amiga graphics card, and as the primary graphics system sold with the MIPS Magnum 4000 series of MIPS-based Windows NT workstations.

Amiga cards based on the G364:

- EGS SPECTRUM 110/24
- Rainbow III
- Visiona Paint (G300)

The G332 found use in the State Machine G8 and Computer Concepts Colour Card for the Acorn Archimedes range of personal computers, these providing a secondary framebuffer to which the main display memory was copied periodically, also offering a broader 24-bit palette for all graphics modes including individually programmable colours for 256-colour modes. The capabilities of the G332 were reported as being "almost identical" to the ARM VIDC20 that was announced at the time these adapter cards became available.

== See also ==
- Graphics processing unit
