= Armando Stettner =

American computer engineer

Armando P. Stettner is a computer engineer and architect who is most widely known for Unix development and for spearheading the native VAX version of UNIX, Ultrix, during his tenure at Digital Equipment Corporation (DEC).

== Biography ==
Stettner started working with UNIX while at Bell Labs Murray Hill and later moved to DEC where he worked for Bill Munson and with Fred Canter and Jerry Brenner to start DEC's UNIX Engineering Group. While his focus was kernel development, he also designed and produced the original UNIX "Live Free or Die" license plate and the original Ultrix poster based on Phil Foglio's UNIX T-shirt as designed by Mike O'Brien. Originally a marketing promotion, Stettner obtained the actual vanity plate from the state of New Hampshire in 1982 after Bill Shannon left to join Sun Microsystems.

With Bill Shannon, Stettner was responsible for establishing near-realtime UUCP-based connections between University of California, Berkeley and Duke University through their system known as decvax. Stettner later established near-realtime netnews and email feeds news feeds to Europe, Japan and Australia. At a conference, he relayed the conversation during a budget review with financial department staff of the nearly $250,000 in phone bills attributed to his department's timesharing computer (known as decvax) explaining that these were computers talking. That seemed to satisfy the finance people.

Stettner ported UNIX to DEC's symmetric multiprocessing VAX-11/782 hardware system, though based upon Purdue University's asymmetric kernel. The kernel supported symmetric multiprocessing while not being fully multithreaded and based upon pre-Ultrix work by Stettner and earlier work by George H. Goble at Purdue University. There was liberal use of locking and some tasks could only be done by a particular CPUs (e.g. the processing of interrupts). This was not uncommon in other SMP implementations of that time (e.g. SunOS).

Stettner proposed and led DEC's VAX UNIX development resulting in Ultrix-32 and was its architect and engineering manager, overseeing the project through its beta trials.

Stettner then went to Palo Alto to start DEC's Palo Alto, CA-based workstation engineering group under Steve Bourne. There, he suggested the creation of an early collaborative organization for developing open Unix standards as a response to collaboration between AT&T and Sun Microsystems. That organization became the Open Software Foundation (OSF).

Shortly thereafter, to more effectively compete with Sun Microsystems, Stettner was part of a team of five DEC employees (with James Billmaier, Joe DiNucci, Mario Paglario, and Skip Garvin) who proposed a UNIX-only workstation product line based upon the MIPS architecture. He was one of the original members of the product design team for the MIPS R2000-based RISC-based DECstation 3100 core design team. Armando later designed a real-time Shuttle tracking system using down-linked telemetry for Kennedy Space Center as late part of NASA's Return to Flight program. The system was later implemented by Computer Sciences Corp. Armando left DEC in 1990. He went on to positions in management consulting, as a technologist at Sun Microsystems, in the office of CTO at Aetna, and other positions.

Starting in 2000, Stettner went to Seattle to work as employee #3 for Paul Allen's Digeo. In 2004, Stettner led IPTV development at Digeo and from 2006 through 2011 was director of FiOS Advanced Development at Verizon. He then worked as vice president of engineering for Gigabit Squared. In 2012 he was one of the technology professionals who signed an open letter opposing the Cyber Intelligence Sharing and Protection Act.
