= Gigabit Squared =

- Formation: 2010
- Dissolved: 2014
- Purpose: Internet Access
- Region served: United States
- Website: gigabitsquared.com

Gigabit Squared, LLC was a digital economic development corporation that specialized in the planning, implementation and rollout of communications infrastructure. Unlike incumbent telecommunications providers in the United States, who typically own and operate networks in addition to providing wholesale and retail Internet access services, Gigabit Squared designed and built networks, but did not always finance, operate and maintain those networks.

== Programs ==
Based near Cleveland, Ohio, the company was founded in October 2010. In May 2012, Gigabit Squared raised $200 million in venture funding to fund high-speed Internet access projects in the United States. The founders include Mark Ansboury, president, and Robert Jennings, executive vice president. Armando Stettner joined in January 2013 as vice president of architecture and technology but left before year-end when it became apparent funding plans had fallen through. The University Community Next Generation Innovation Project (Gig.U), a coalition of 30 universities headed by Blair Levin, helped select the projects. Announced in May 2012, the Gigabit Neighborhood Gateway Program intended to bring gigabit-per-second Internet access to up to six university communities in the United States. The project was open to university communities, who needed to apply to the project. Instead of committing funds to a project, communities were asked to commit to help lower costs of deployment and smooth regulatory barriers to deploying a network. This is similar to the agreement Google Fiber struck with Kansas City, Kansas and Kansas City, Missouri.

In October 2012, the University of Chicago, in partnership with the State of Illinois and the City of Chicago, announced the Gigabit Chicago project with Gigabit Squared to bring gigabit-speed fiber to over 4,825 residents, businesses, schools and healthcare institutions in the Chicago’s Mid-South Side neighborhoods.

The state awarded $2 million to Gigabit Squared as part of the Illinois Gigabit Communities Challenge. The University of Chicago has committed $2 million, and Gigabit Squared $5 million for Gigabit Chicago. Gigabit squared entered into an agreement with the City of Chicago, and also obtained a $2 million grant. However, this project ran into problems, according to the David Roeder, spokesman for the Illinois Department of Commerce and Economic Opportunity, Gigabit Squared "has repeatedly lied" about its intentions.

Announced December 13, 2012, Gigabit Seattle was a fiber-to-the-home / fiber-to-the-business network being deployed in Seattle, Washington. The network arose from a partnership between the City of Seattle, the University of Washington and Gigabit Squared. In January 2014, the partnership with Seattle was declared dead by new mayor Ed Murray, who noted that the company had not raised sufficient money and owed the city over $50,000 in unpaid bills.
