= Henry Katzenstein =

American physicist and entrepreneur

Henry Sour Katzenstein (January 9, 1927 – January 10, 2003) was an American physicist and entrepreneur. He founded a company called Brooktree in 1983 to commercialize a new architecture for digital to analog converters that he developed.

The company name was taken from the street name where Dr. Katzenstein lived at the time he invented the then-novel circuit arrangement.

The company's first product to reach the market was an 8-bit CMOS D/A converter intended for video applications. Introduced in early 1985, the first "VideoDAC" had an output clock rate of up to 75 MHz and 1/4 LSB accuracy—3-8 times better than typical contemporary devices. A headline in the 27 June edition of Electronic Design called the device "trailblazing".
