= Gigabit Chicago =

Gigabit Chicago is a gigabit-speed networking project in Chicago. It is a partnership of the State of Illinois, the City of Chicago and Gigabit Squared.

== Background ==
Following up on a request for information issued in September 2012, in October, the University of Chicago, in partnership with the State of Illinois and the city, announced a project to bring gigabit-speed fiber to over 4,825 residents, businesses, schools and healthcare institutions in the Chicago's Mid-South Side neighborhoods. Based on neighborhood participation and adoption, it has been reported that next generation broadband access (gigabit-per-second) will be potentially available to as many as 210,000 residents who live in over 79,000 households as well as the 10,000 businesses in the area.

== Components ==
The project consists of a fiber-to-the-home / fiber-to-the-business network as well as an ultra-high speed wireless network.

== Deployment and services ==
The network will initially be deployed to 9 demonstration neighborhoods:

- Hyde Park
- Kenwood
- Woodlawn
- Washington Park
- South Shore
- Greater Grand Crossing
- Grand Boulevard
- Douglas
- Oakland

Hyde Park, Kenwood, Woodlawn and Washington Park will be among the initial neighborhoods for the buildout, getting fiber and wireless capacity in the next year. The other communities will start with wireless capacity, to be built out with fiber in the next 4 years.

== Partnership ==
The State of Illinois awarded $2 million to Gigabit Squared as part of the Illinois Gigabit Communities Challenge. The University of Chicago committed $2 million, and Gigabit Squared will provide $5 million for the Gigabit Chicago project.

The network will be owned and operated by Gigabit Squared.

== Financial and Organizational issues ==
Gigabit Chicago's parent company, Gigabit Squared had its co-founder and president resign early in 2014 after Seattle sued over unpaid bills.

Chicago was also facing issues with Gigabit, as no milestones have been met after $2 million of investment from the city.
