= Geometry pipelines =

Computer graphics concept

Geometric manipulation of modelling primitives, such as that performed by a geometry pipeline, is the first stage in computer graphics systems which perform image generation based on geometric models. While geometry pipelines were originally implemented in software, they have become highly amenable to hardware implementation, particularly since the advent of very-large-scale integration (VLSI) in the early 1980s. A device called the Geometry Engine developed by Jim Clark and Marc Hannah at Stanford University in about 1981 was the watershed for what has since become an increasingly commoditized function in contemporary image-synthetic raster display systems.

Geometric transformations are applied to the vertices of polygons, or other geometric objects used as modelling primitives, as part of the first stage in a classical geometry-based graphic image rendering pipeline. Geometric computations may also be applied to transform polygon or repair surface normals, and then to perform the lighting and shading computations used in their subsequent rendering.

== History ==
Hardware implementations of the geometry pipeline were introduced in the early Evans & Sutherland Picture System, but perhaps received broader recognition when later applied in the broad range of graphics systems products introduced by Silicon Graphics (SGI). Initially the SGI geometry hardware performed simple model space to screen space viewing transformations with all the lighting and shading handled by a separate hardware implementation stage. In later, much higher performance applications, such as the RealityEngine, they began to be applied to perform part of the rendering support as well.

More recently, perhaps dating from the late 1990s, the hardware support required to perform the manipulation and rendering of quite complex scenes has become accessible to the consumer market. Companies such as Nvidia and AMD Graphics (formerly ATI) are two current leading representatives of hardware vendors in this space. The GeForce line of graphics cards from Nvidia was the first to support full OpenGL and Direct3D hardware geometry processing in the consumer PC market, while some earlier products such as Rendition Verite incorporated hardware geometry processing through proprietary programming interfaces. On the whole, earlier graphics accelerators by 3Dfx, Matrox and others relied on the CPU for geometry processing.

This subject matter is part of the technical foundation for modern computer graphics, and is a comprehensive topic taught at both the undergraduate and graduate levels as part of a computer science education.

== See also ==
- Vertex pipeline
- Graphics pipeline (include Pixel pipeline)
- Rasterisation
- Open Graphics Project
