= Brooktree =

American company

Brooktree Corporation
- Industry: Semiconductors
- Founded: 1983; 43 years ago
- Defunct: 1996; 30 years ago
- Fate: Acquired by Rockwell Semiconductor; division spun out in 1998
- Successor: Conexant
- Headquarters: USA

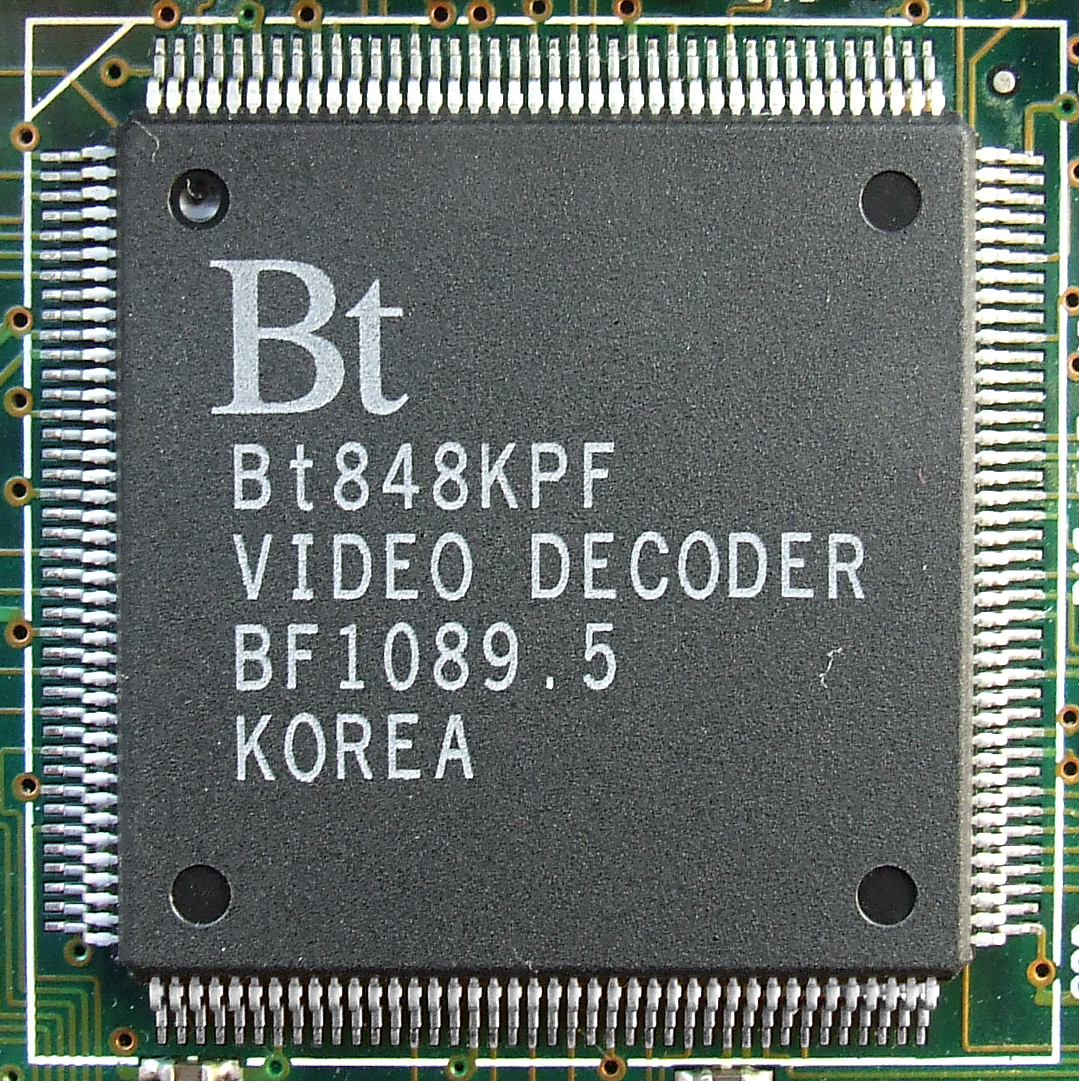
A Brooktree video decoder

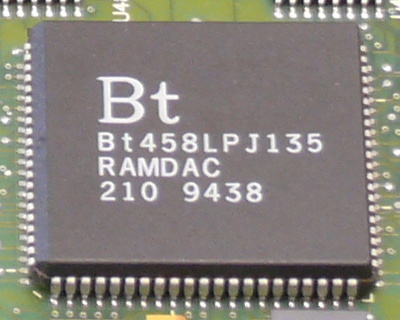
A Brooktree RAMDAC

Brooktree Corporation was an American company founded in 1983 by Henry Katzenstein to commercialize a faster hardware architecture for digital to analog converters, three to eight times faster than the converters then on the market. Their products used a unique current-driven design that allowed them to switch at much faster rates than voltage-based switching. Their videoDAC products were the first capable of driving 2K resolution monitors, which made them near-universal on workstation systems in the early 1990s. The integration of similar systems on existing drivers and the move to all-digital monitor standards eliminated the need for this class of chips.

Brooktree turned from the DAC market to video capture, introducing the Bt848 in the early 1990s. Fed the signal from a radio frequency receiver, the Bt848 produced a digital output that could then be compressed and stored. These were widely used in TV tuner cards from companies like Hauppauge Computer Works in the mid-1990s. An updated version, the Bt878, added audio digitization too, reducing the chip count of the overall decoder system. The company was bought out by Rockwell Semiconductor in 1996, which became Conexant (Nasdaq: CNXT) in 1998. The last chip in the Brooktree line was the Fusion 878, which added MPEG-2 support and the ability to decode ATSC digital video.

== History ==
=== Background ===
Computer graphics are represented by a series of numbers held in memory. These numbers represent a color to be displayed on the screen in a particular location, a pixel. The process of turning the number into the analog signal for display requires the use of a digital-to-analog convertor (DAC), which, in the early 1980s, was normally being handled by custom hardware on the graphics card that required several separate components. In typical examples, the system had the ability to generate colors from a pallet that might be 8 to 24-bits, but due to the limited amount of main memory, normally stored 1 to 8-bit values for any given pixel. Each of the possible stored values was converted to a particular set of RGB output values using a "color lookup table", or "LUT" (sometimes "CLUT").

=== LUT chips ===
Henry Sour Katzenstein was living in Los Angeles in 1981 when he developed the idea for an entirely new way to produce a DAC. The limitation on existing systems was the switching speed, which was a function of the need to switch from 1 to 0 or back while producing enough voltage to drive the DAC to the levels needed by the display. This was normally accomplished using a color mapping chip and then separate amplifiers. Given the existing semiconductor fabrication (fab) systems of the era, this limited most systems to about 25 MHz or less, which was enough for displays running around 640 pixels horizontally. Moreover, the rapid switching of the relatively high-power outputs, produces noise on the power supply that often came through in the signal and on the motherboard.

Katzenstein's concept was to produce output based on current levels, not voltage, and to control that current by mixing two current sources, positive and negative. This meant that the incoming power was always "full on" and only the outputs varied, eliminating the switching noise. Current-controlled circuitry was well developed in the analog market, and high-speed current switches were easy to fab. The downside to this approach was that the resulting IC was always drawing full power, which dissipated as heat, and the ICs ran extremely hot. (Note: Hot enough to burn you.)

The basic concept was developed enough by 1983 that he formed Brooktree, named after a street he formerly lived on in San Diego, using venture capital funding. The videoDAC was put on the market in 1985. Running at 75 MHz, about four times the speed of most contemporary systems, it could drive a display up to 2,048 pixels wide at 60 fps. Although mass production did not begin until 1988, when computer monitors with this sort of resolution began to appear, the design quickly began to steal market share from companies like AMD, Analog Devices and Texas Instruments. Large customers included Apple Computer, Sun Microsystems, Toshiba and IBM.

The company's next product was a similar design with one key difference, the mapping from the input values to output was no longer through a fixed table, but one that could be written to. This meant that "color 100" could be green for one program, and blue for another, with the output RGB levels stored as an 18- or 24-bit value in RAM. The result, known to the company as a RAMDAC but more commonly known today generically as a LUT-DAC, gave the system much greater flexibility. While successful for a time, it was not long before the relentless improvements in fabrication allowed companies to incorporate the LUT-DAC into the same IC as the rest of the controller logic, and Brooktree's line of separate ICs began to wane.

=== Video capture ===
Brooktree turned its attention from the LUT market to video capture, introducing the Bt848 in the early 1990s. This became very popular in video capture boards for personal computers, digital video cameras and similar devices. One version also included the ability to capture and decode teletext information for use in Europe. The Bt878 followed, adding audio decoders as well, including FM radio, reducing the number of chips needed to produce a complete television decoder. The audio could be converted to 8-bit or 16-bit values at 44,800 samples per second, the equivalent of CD audio.

The company was purchased by Rockwell during this period, and it later spun out its semiconductor division as Conexant. Conexant shipped one final version of the line, the Conexant Fusion 878A. The major addition to the Fusion is an MPEG2 decoder, which allows it to receive ATSC digital video in addition to the earlier analog formats. In order to make the adoption as simple as possible, the digital audio pins from the Bt878 were used as the ATSC inputs in the Fusion. As ATSC carries both digital video and audio, nothing is lost when using these for digital video.

== See also ==
- Video capture card
- Hauppauge Computer Works
