= James Billmaier =

American author

James A. Billmaier
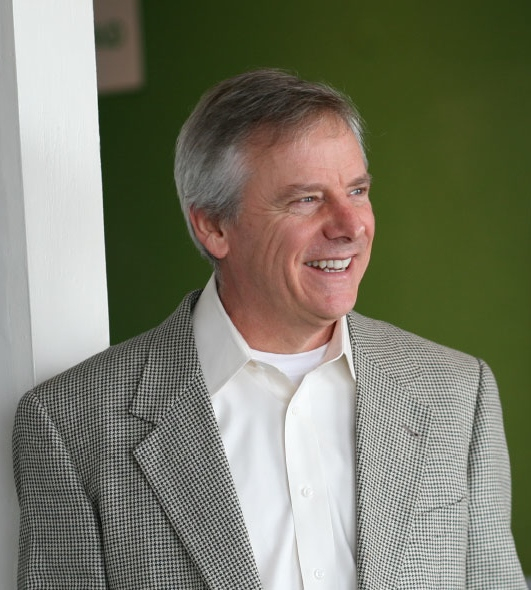
- Citizenship: American
- Education: Santa Clara University
- Occupations: Businessperson, author
- Writing career
- Language: English

James Billmaier (born May 10, 1955) is an American technology businessman, inventor, and author. He is currently the founder of FairwayBikes, Inc. Prior to Fairway Bikes Billmaier co-founded and was CEO of TurboPatent Corporation.

== Early life and education ==
James A. Billmaier graduated from Santa Clara University in 1977.

== Career ==
Billmaier was responsible for Unix workstation products and strategies at Digital Equipment Corporation.

He then became vice president of software marketing and business development at MIPS Technologies. From February 1992 through 1995, he was vice president and general manager of the networking software division at Sun Microsystems in Mountain View, California.

In July 1995, he became chief executive officer at Asymetrix, which was founded by Paul Allen. Based in Bellevue, Washington, Billmaier lead the company to an IPO in June 1998. The company changed its name to Click2Learn in 1999.

Billmaier became the founding CEO of Digeo in 1999 where he led the acquisition of the Moxi product line in 2002. Billmaier and his team won back-to-back Emmy Awards for Technical Achievement in 2004 and 2005. Billmaier left Digeo in April 2005.

In August 2005, Billmaier became CEO of the music service Melodeo. It was acquired by Hewlett-Packard in June 2010.

Billmaier is a founding partner of Charge Northwest, an electric vehicle infrastructure advisory and software integration company.

In October 2010, he published JOLT!: The Impending Dominance of the Electric Car and Why America Must Take Charge.

Billmaier was an executive producer of the Academy Award nominated documentary, Chasing Ice.

Billmaier is the inventor of more than 100 granted or filed patents.
