= Cobalt (disambiguation) =

Cobalt is a chemical element with symbol Co and atomic number 27.

Cobalt may also refer to:

== Places ==
- Cobalt, Connecticut, United States
- Cobalt, Idaho, United States
- Cobalt, Missouri, United States
- Cobalt, Ontario, Canada

== Arts and entertainment ==
=== Games ===
- Cobalt (video game)
- Cobalt WASD

=== Music ===
- Cobalt (band), a band from Colorado
- Cobalt (EP), 2021 EP by Meaningful Stone
- Co-Balt, the second studio album by the band Brute

=== Other arts and entertainment ===
- Cobalt, a fictional human-computer augmentation company in the Leigh Whannell films Upgrade and The Invisible Man
- "Cobalt" (Fear the Walking Dead), an episode named after a fictional evacuation operation
- Cobalt (magazine), a shōjo fiction magazine published in Japan
- Martin Cobalt, a pseudonym of the writer William Mayne (1928–2010)

== Technology ==
- COBALT, a radio correlator; see Low-Frequency Array (LOFAR) § Timeline
- CoOperative Blending of Autonomous Landing Technologies, a NASA project

=== Computing ===
- Cobalt (CAD program)
- Cobalt, version 6.0 of Palm OS
- Cobalt Networks, a computer hardware company, or their server appliances:
  - Cobalt RaQ, a rackmount server
  - Cobalt Qube, an appliance for web servers
- Open Cobalt, the open source virtual world browser and construction toolkit

== Other uses ==
- Chevrolet Cobalt, a compact car
- Cobalt Air, a Cypriot airline
- Cobalt blue, a color
- Cobalt Park, a British business park
- Cobalt Boats, an American manufacturer of recreational motorboats
- Cobalt Labs, an American cybersecurity startup

== See also ==
- Cobalt-60 (disambiguation)
- Co (disambiguation)
- COBOL, a computer programming language
- Kobalt (disambiguation)
