= C60 =

C60, C.60, or C-60 may refer to:

== Vehicles and transport ==
- Caudron C.60, a 1920s French two-seat biplane
- Chevrolet C-60, a medium-duty truck
- Lockheed C-60 Lodestar a WW2-era transport airplane
- JNR Class C60, a Japanese class of steam locomotives
- Autovia C-60, a highway in Catalonia, Spain

== Science ==
- Buckminsterfullerene, a carbon molecule with the chemical formula C_{60}, also known as a buckyball
- Caldwell 60, one of the Antennae Galaxies in the constellation Corvus
- Corydoras osteocarus, a freshwater catfish
- Carcinoma of the penis ICD-10 code
- A kind of carbon called carbon fibre

== Other uses ==
- AMD C-60 (formerly AMD Fusion C-60), a computer processor by AMD, codename "Ontario"
- Bill C-60, a proposed Canadian law
- C60 (band), a band also known as Cobalt 60
- A 60-minute audio Compact Cassette tape
- Ruy Lopez chess openings ECO code
