= Cobalt-60 (disambiguation) =

Cobalt-60 is a radioactive isotope of cobalt. (See Isotopes of cobalt.)

Cobalt-60 can also mean:

- Cobalt 60 (band) is an electro-industrial band
- Cobalt 60 (comic) is a comic series created by Vaughn Bodē
- Cobalt 60 was also the original name for the band C60 (band).

== See also ==
- Cobalt (disambiguation)
