= Strongbolt =

Operating system installation application

Strongbolt is an operating system installation application based on the Linux operating system written by James McLoughlin. The Strongbolt operating system is specifically for Cobalt RaQ Appliance Servers. Sun Microsystems discontinued the popular Cobalt server appliances in 2004. Strongbolt was created in order to provide a new, actively developed operating system for these Server appliances. Strongbolt OS is a CentOS and BlueQuartz operating system installer for Cobalt RaQ and Cobalt Qube servers. The system installs similarly to the original Cobalt RaQ install disk. The new StrongBolt 2 release can also be installed from a USB key directly in the USB port. Strongbolt has been out of active development for several years.

== Internals ==
CentOS 4.4 with an older 2.6 Linux Kernel and the BlueQuartz administration panel.

Installs CentOS + Bluequartz on Cobalt RaQ3's, RaQ4's, RaQ550 and Qube3.

== See also ==
- Operating system
- Server
