= A Call from My Dream =

Studio album by Meaningful Stone
- Released: 27 September 2020
- Genre: Indie pop
- Length: 42:25
- Label: Poclanos
- Producer: Meaningful Stone

Meaningful Stone chronology
A Call from My Dream (2020)	Cobalt (2021)

A Call from My Dream (Korean: 꿈에서 걸려온 전화; RR: Kkumeseo geollyeoon jeonhwa) is the debut studio album by South Korean singer-songwriter Meaningful Stone. The album was released on 27 September 2020. Through this album, Meaningful Stone won the 2021 Rookie of the Year at the Korean Music Awards, and the track Beep-Boop, Beep-Boop (삐뽀삐뽀) was also nominated as a best modern rock song.

== Background ==
Meaningful Stone interviewed that she planned an album after she actually dreamt of answering the phone. And she described as an album that summarised her past self. The album was crowdfunded and achieved over 200% of the target amount.

== Critical reception ==
Chase McMullen of Beats Per Minute reviewed "A Call from My Dream is the sound of a more-than-promising new voice in Korean DIY music finding herself". Cho Hye-rim, a judge at the Korean Music Awards said "A Call from My Dream proves that Meaningful Stone is a musician who deserves enough attention for her music itself".

== Track listing ==
No.	Title	Length
1.	"A Call from My Dream" ("꿈에서 걸려온 전화")	4:15
2.	"Nameless" ("이름이 없는 사람")	4:20
3.	"Small Death" ("작은 종말") (featuring Jungwoo)	4:59
4.	"Butterfly Dust" ("나빗가루")	2:45
5.	"Ah," ("아참,")	3:23
6.	"Treasure Hunt" ("보물찾기")	3:03
7.	"Footsteps" ("성큼성큼")	4:05
8.	"Beep-Boop, Beep-Boop" ("삐뽀삐뽀")	3:24
9.	"As If" ("실패하지 않는 사랑이 있나요")	4:32
10.	"Shower Duty" ("샤워를 해야해")	4:33
11.	"Beep-Boop, Beep-Boop (2018)" ("삐뽀삐뽀 (2018)")	3:06
