= Meaningful Stone =

South Korean indie rock musician

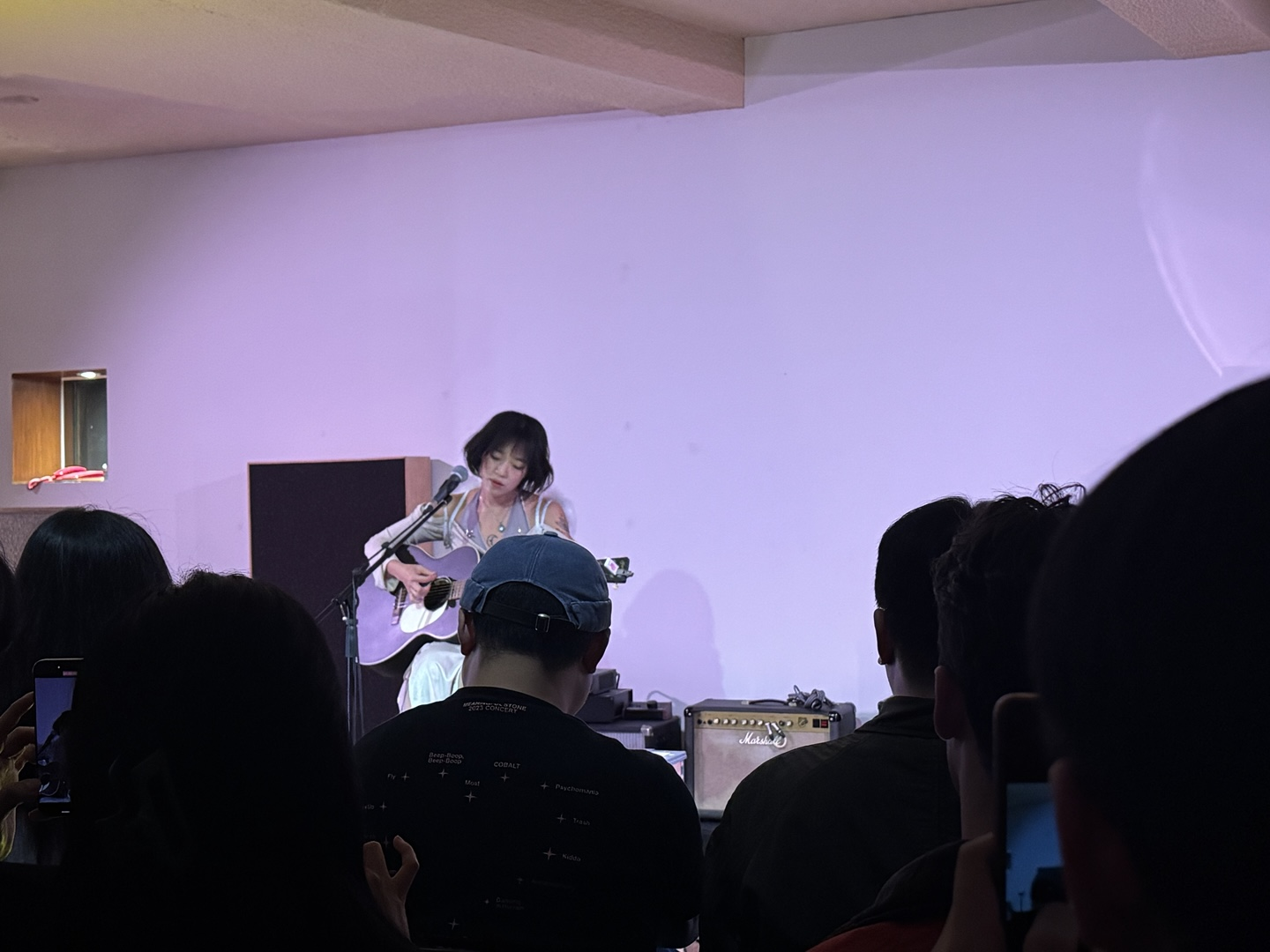
- Meaningful Stone in 2024

Background information
- Born: Kim Jimin; June 15, 1996 (age 30)
- Origin: Gwangju, Gyeonggi, South Korea
- Genre: Indie rock
- Years active: 2017–present
- Label: Poclanos

- Meaningful Stone
- Hangul: 김지민
- RR: Gim Jimin
- MR: Kim Chimin

Stage name
- Hangul: 김뜻돌
- RR: Gim Tteutdol
- MR: Kim Ttŭttol

Kim Jimin (Korean: 김지민; born June 15, 1996), better known by her stage name Meaningful Stone (Korean: 김뜻돌), is a South Korean indie rock musician. She has released two studio albums: A Call from My Dream (꿈에서 걸려온 전화) (2020) and Angel Interview (천사 인터뷰) (2024).

== Career ==
Kim Jimin was born in 1996 in Gwangju, Gyeonggi. She was influenced by her father's music taste, and she first started music at 15 with the guitar he bought for her. She moved to Seoul to attend university and majored in social science.

On July 21, 2017, Meaningful Stone released her first single, 꿈속의 카메라. She released several singles before releasing her debut studio album, and released her first studio album, A Call from My Dream (꿈에서 걸려온 전화) in 2020. She won the Rookie of the Year at the 2021 Korean Music Awards.

In 2021, she released EP Cobalt. She has performed at Korean rock festivals such as the Pentaport Rock Festival and the DMZ Peace Train Music Festival. In 2023, she released her new single, The Fifth Spring (다섯 번째 봄). She announced the release of her Sophomore album Angel Interview (천사 인터뷰) on November 28, 2024. She was nominated for Best Rock Album at the 2022 Korean Music Awards.

== Discography ==
=== Studio albums ===
- A Call from My Dream (꿈에서 걸려온 전화) (2020)
- Angel Interview (천사 인터뷰) (2024)

=== EPs ===
- Cobalt (2021)
- To: Hana (2026)
