= Kobalt =

Kobalt may refer to:

- Kobalt (DC Comics), a comic book superhero
- Kobalt (tools), a brand of tools
- Kobalt Music Group, a music publishing company
- OTs-01 Kobalt, a Russian revolver

== See also ==
- Cobalt (disambiguation)
