= Cobalt (EP) =

EP by Meaningful Stone
- Released: 8 September 2021
- Genre: Indie pop
- Length: 42:25
- Label: Poclanos
- Producer: Meaningful Stone

Meaningful Stone chronology
A Call from My Dream (2020)	Cobalt (2021)

Cobalt (Korean: 코발트, stylised COBALT) is the extended play (EP) by South Korean singer-songwriter Meaningful Stone. The album was released on 8 September 2021. The album's track Dancing in the Rain (비 오는 거리에서 춤을 추자) was nominated for Best Modern Rock Song at the 2022 Korean Music Awards.

== Background ==
After the success of her first studio album A Call from My Dream, Meaningful Stone began recording on a new EP. In an interview with IZM, she mentioned the album and the title track as a heartbreaking love story she wrote for the first time in a long time.

== Critical reception ==
Professional ratings
Review scores
Source	Rating
IZM	3/5 stars

Kim Seongwook of IZM reviewed "Music of youth recorded by a young musician as old music style, has blossomed blue from its glorious peril." "The song beautifully proved the current trend of the rock genre, which fell into a long recession but functioning again as the language of youth." The member of the selection committee for the Korean Music Awards Kim Doheon described the album's track Dancing in the Rain as "It beautifully proved the current trend of the rock genre, which fell into a long recession but functioning again as the language of youth."

== Track listing ==
No.	Title	Length
1.	"COBALT"	4:32
2.	"Most" ("중요해")	3:37
3.	"Dancing in the Rain" ("비 오는 거리에서 춤을 추자")	3:43
4.	"Mangwon Street" ("비 오는 망원로")	1:23
5.	"Fly" ("훨훨")	3:18
