= Cobalt RaQ =

Line of rackmount servers

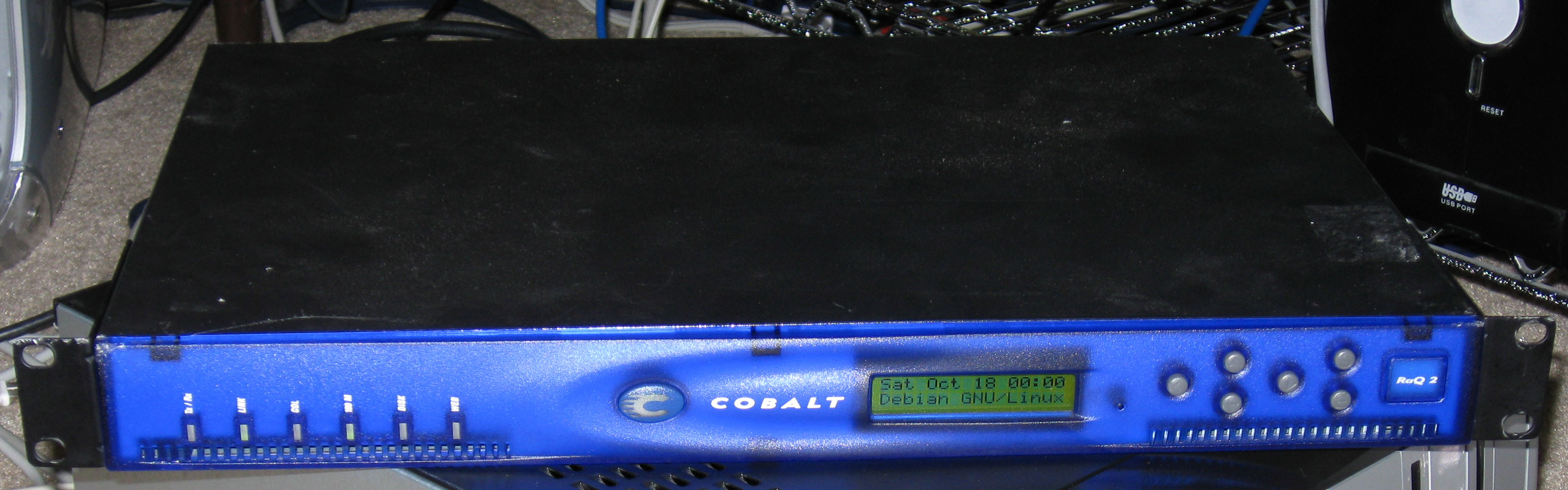
Cobalt RaQ 2, running Debian GNU/Linux, as indicated by the front display

The Cobalt RaQ is a 1U rackmount server product line developed by Cobalt Networks, Inc. (later purchased by Sun Microsystems) featuring a modified Red Hat Linux operating system and a proprietary GUI for server management. The original RaQ systems were equipped with MIPS RM5230 or RM5231 CPUs but later models used AMD K6-2 chips and then eventually Intel Pentium III CPUs for the final models.

The Cobalt RaQ was the second product line produced by Cobalt Networks; the first was the Cobalt Qube.

== Server specifications ==
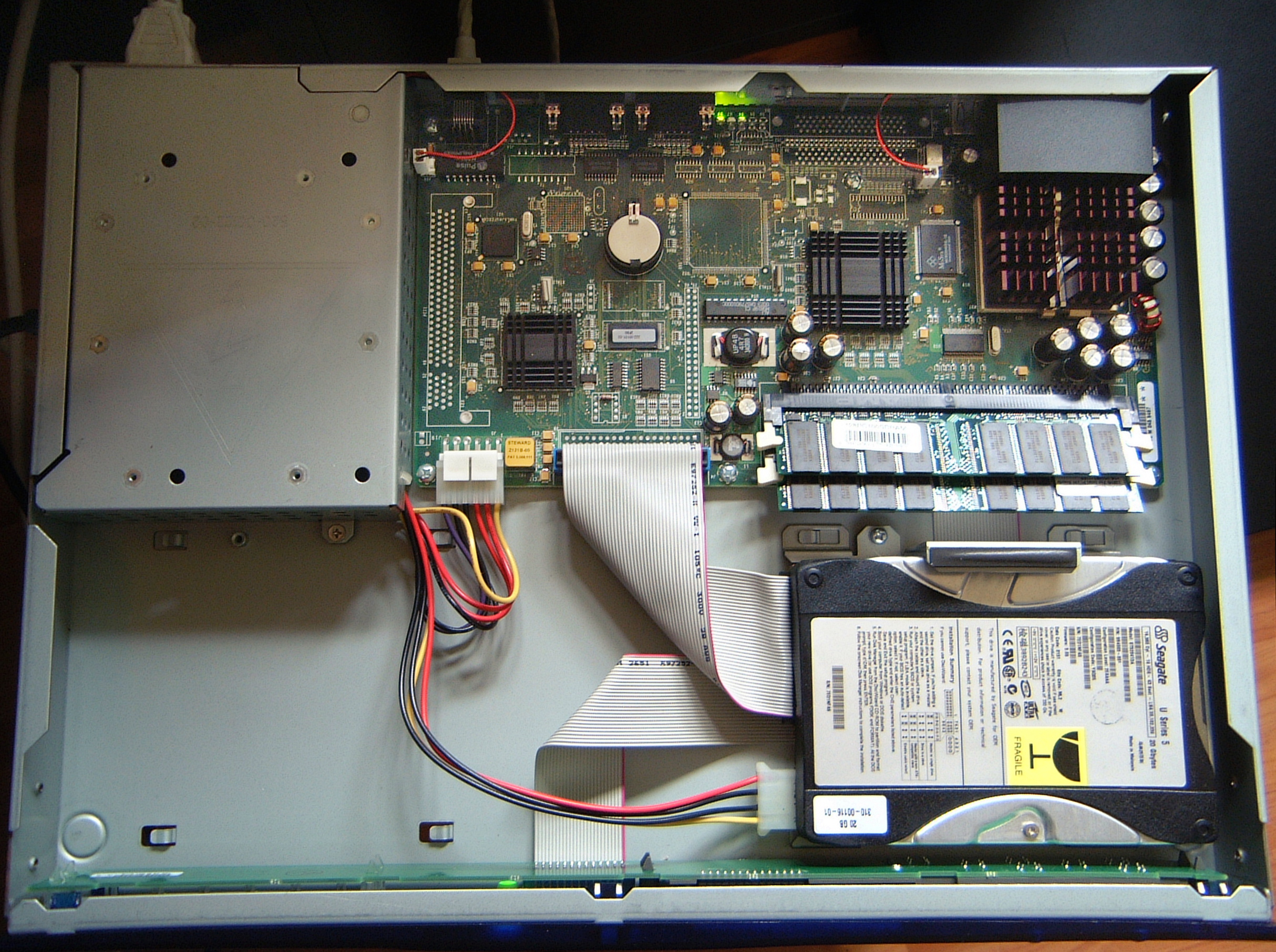
Cobalt RaQ3 with lid removed

Below is a list of Cobalt RaQ types, and their specs.

Model	CPU type	Default CPU Speed
Cobalt RaQ	RM5230	150 MHz
Cobalt RaQ 2	RM5231	250 MHz
Cobalt RaQ 3	AMD K6-2	300 MHz
Cobalt RaQ 4	AMD K6-2	450 MHz
Cobalt RaQ XTR	Intel Pentium III	733 MHz or 933 MHz (original release); 850 MHz or 1 GHz (re-release)
Cobalt RaQ 550	Intel Pentium III	1 GHz or 1.26 GHz

Under an OEM arrangement, RaQ 2 units were also produced by Seagate, in the form of the Seagate NasRaQ.

There were variants of the RaQ 3 and RaQ 4 models known as the RaQ 3i or RaQ 4i (SCSI support, two Ethernet connectors, PCI connector), and the RaQ 4r (SCSI support, two Ethernet connectors, and RAID). RAID on these models was accomplished in software using a second IDE channel on the motherboard for the second hard drive. There was also a "bare bones" RaQ 4 model that had a single Ethernet adapter, no external SCSI, and a single hard drive.

The RaQ 3 shipped with Chili!soft ASP support. Cobalt acquired Chili!soft a few months prior to being acquired by Sun.

The RaQ 4 added PHP support to the RaQ 3 payload.

The RaQ XTR was the first 1U server to have four removable hard drives. Unfortunately, the first release was plagued with hardware problems and was recalled. This happened during the Cobalt acquisition, and it took over 6 months to get the XTR re-released. It was never a big seller. The XTR UI was also a "hybrid" between the newer PHP-based Sausalito system and the older Perl-based "special sauce" that powered the RaQ 1 - RaQ 4.

Symantec's Veloci Raptor firewall appliances were also based on the RaQ XTR hardware. These systems were equipped with an additional 2-port network card. Together with the two onboard network cards the system had four network interfaces.

The RaQ 550 was the final appliance from the Cobalt division. It added Java support to the RaQ 4 payload, and was the first RaQ to use only the Sausalito UI originated in the Qube 3.

Not long after the Cobalt acquisition, Sun terminated the Cobalt product, announcing the Cobalt range End of Life (EOL). Sun also announced it would discontinue all support and upgrades on the RAQ1-RAQ4 and XTR, and would stop offering these services for the RAQ550 and Qube3 in the end of 2007.

On December 23, 2003, Sun released the RAQ550/Sausalito source code under the BSD license. Ever since developers have tried to keep the Cobalt project alive. Examples are BlueQuartz, maintained by a group of Japanese fans, BlueOnyx maintained by former Cobalt RaQ consultants and RackStar, an initiative of RAQTweak (Cobalt RAQ consultants) and several ex-Sun/Cobalt engineers such as Tim Hockin and Patrick Baltz.

The installation of a standard Linux distribution on the newer x86-based RaQs is possible. The installation of a distribution based on the Linux 2.6 kernel, or newer, requires either the replacement of the ROM software (the RaQ does not have a typical BIOS), or the use of chain loading. CoLO can be used for this purpose.

== See also ==
- Cobalt Qube
- Linux
- NetBSD
- Red Hat
- Red Hat Linux
- Cobalt Networks
- Sun Microsystems
- Strongbolt
