= Cobalt Networks =

Computer appliance company (1996–2000)

Cobalt Networks, Inc.
- Founded: 1996; 30 years ago
- Founder: Vivek Mehra
- Defunct: December 7, 2000; 25 years ago
- Fate: Acquired by Sun Microsystems
- Headquarters: Mountain View, California
- Revenue: ▲$22 million (1999)
- Net income: ▼ -$23 million (1999)
- Total assets: ▲$151 million (1999)
- Total equity: ▲$130 million (1999)
- Number of employees: 140 (1999)

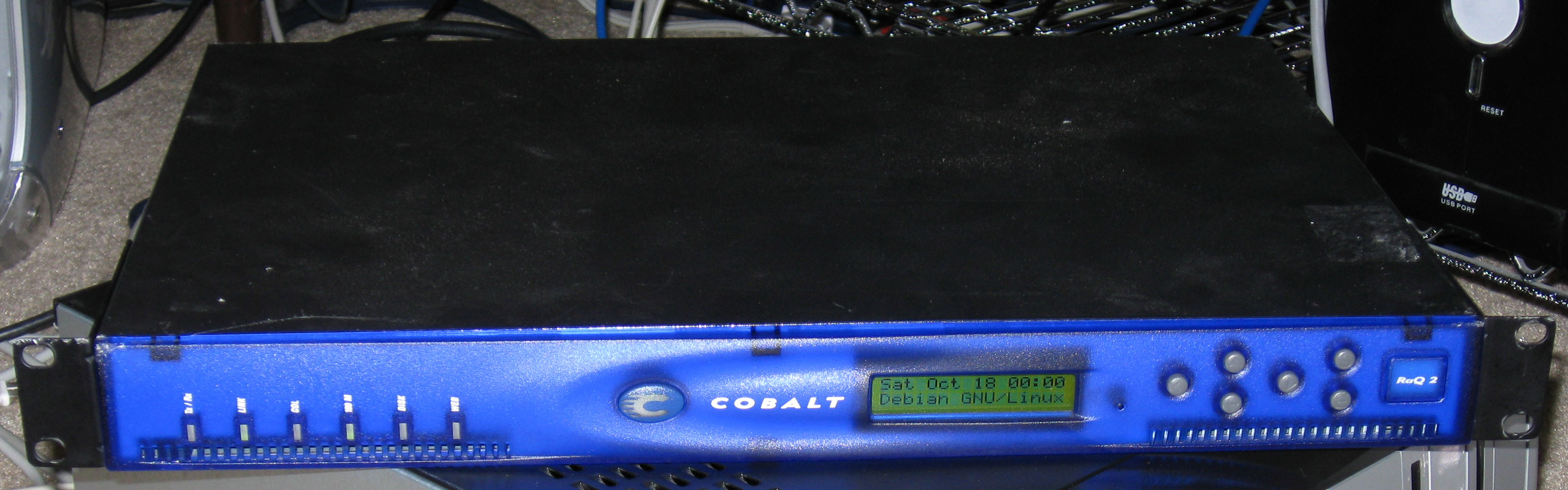
Cobalt RaQ 2

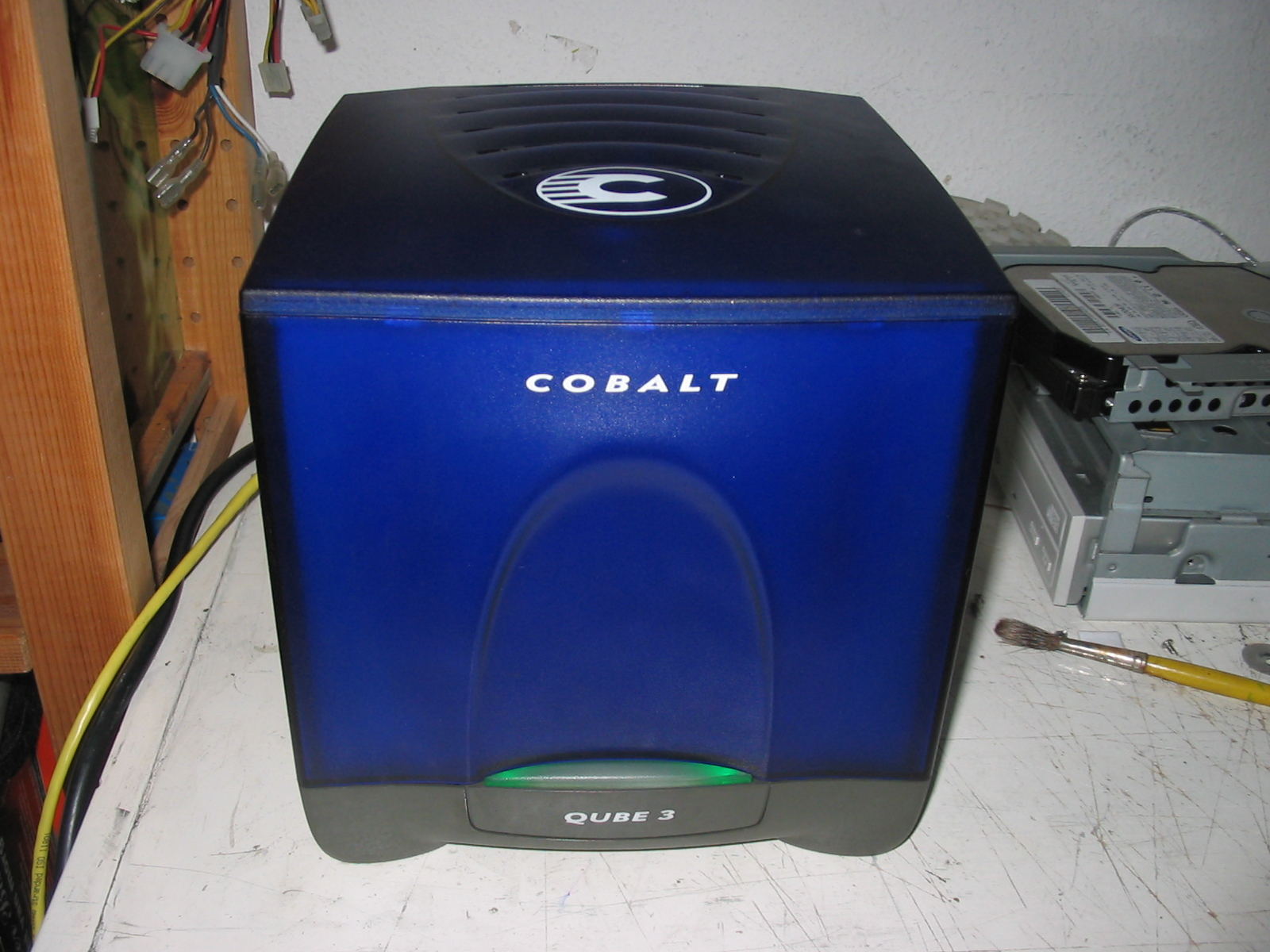
Cobalt Qube - a computer server appliance

Cobalt Networks was a maker of low-cost Linux-based servers and server appliances based in Mountain View, California. The company had 1,900 end user customers in more than 70 countries.

During the dot-com bubble, the company had a market capitalization of $6 billion, despite only $22 million in annual revenue.

In 2000, the company was acquired by Sun Microsystems and in December 2003, Sun shut down the Cobalt product line.

Cobalt was considered a pioneering server appliance vendor, the first to market a 1 RU rackmounted server, and was credited by the founder of RLX Technologies as paving the way for blade servers.

== History ==
The company was founded in 1996 by Vivek Mehra as Cobalt Microserver. In June 1998, the company changed its name to Cobalt Networks, Inc.

The company introduced products as follows:

Product	Launch date
Cobalt Qube	March 1998
Cobalt Cache	July 1998
Cobalt RaQ	September 1998
Cobalt NAS	April 1999
Cobalt Management Console	October 1999

On November 5, 1999, the company became a public company via an initial public offering. Its stock price rose as much as 618% above its $22/share initial price.

On March 23, 2000, the company announced the acquisition of Chilisoft for 1.15 million shares of Cobalt common stock, then valued at $69.9 million.

In September 2000, Sun Microsystems announced the acquisition of the company for $2 billion in stock. The acquisition was completed on December 7, 2000. Many disgruntled engineers left the company in the months following the acquisition.

In December 2003, Sun shut down the Cobalt product line,with the dual-processor Raq 550 being its last appliance server.
