= Cobalt Qube =

Line of server appliances

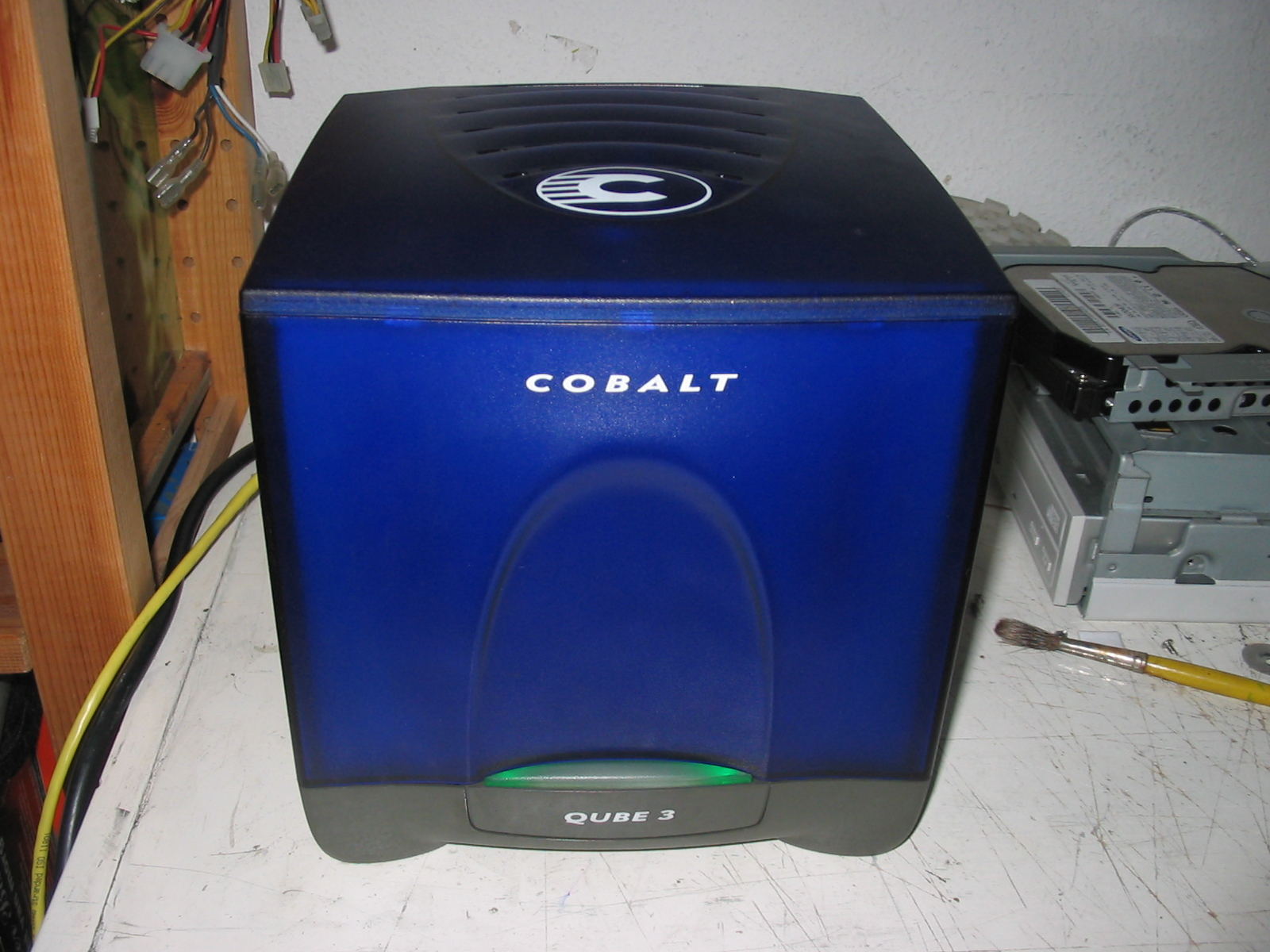
Qube 3 front

The Cobalt Qube was a computer server appliance product line, meant to be web servers, developed by Cobalt Networks, Inc. (later purchased by Sun Microsystems) from 1998 to 2002 featuring a modified Red Hat Linux operating system and a proprietary GUI for server management. The original Qube systems were equipped with RM5230 or RM5231 microprocessors but later models used AMD K6-2 chips. NetBSD operating system has been ported to both the Cobalt Qube and RaQ.

== Models ==
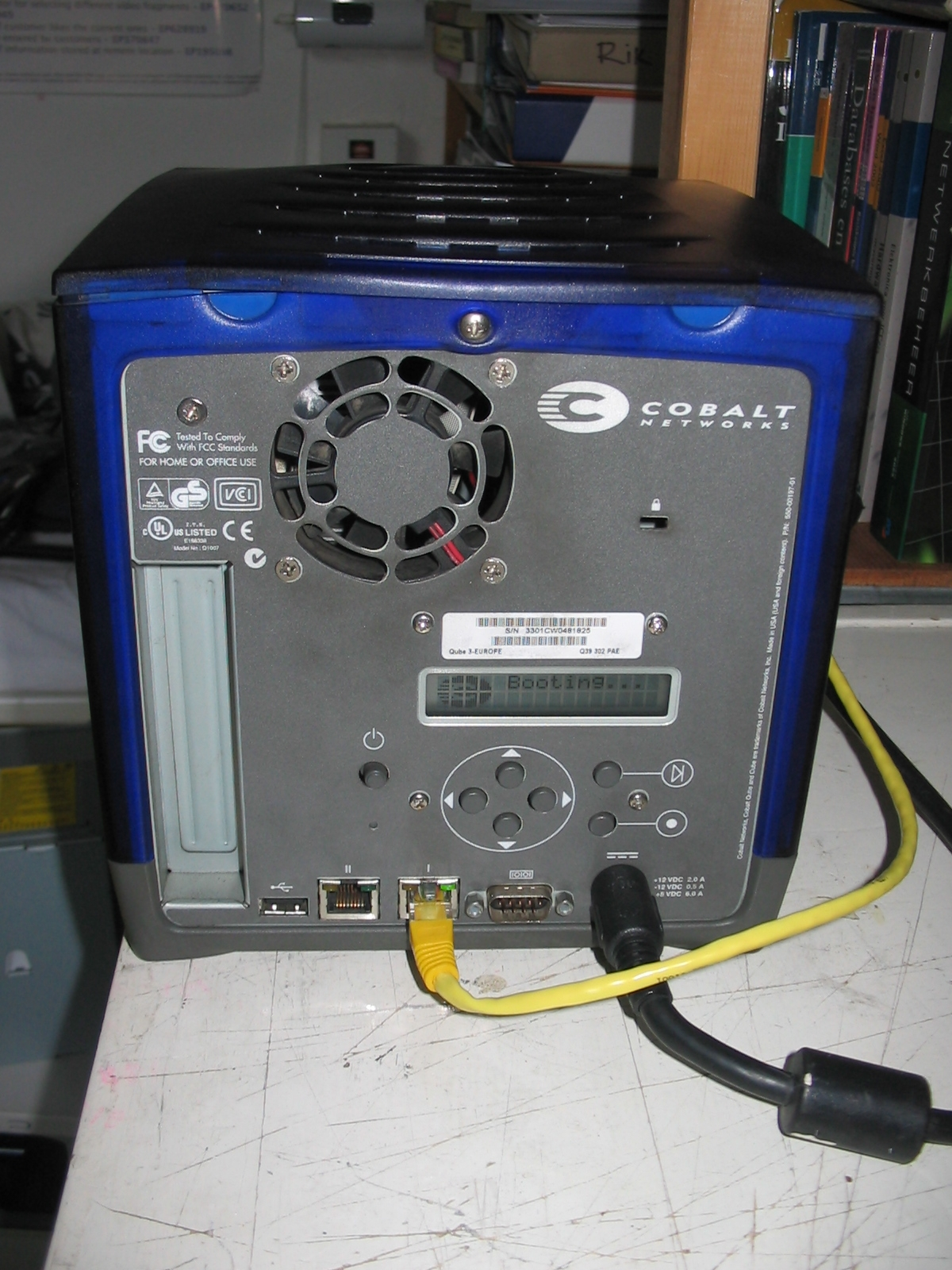
Qube 3 back; this model lacks an external SCSI port.

The Qube 2700 was the first product released by Cobalt Networks in 1998. Mark Orr, one of the Cobalt Networks' CEOs, came up with the cobalt color. The green LED in the front was Bill Scott's idea. The 2700 was not a development version number but came from the atomic number of cobalt, 27. The Qube 2700 used the RM5230 microprocessor.

The next product was called the Qube 2800 before being sold. But, released in 2000, was eventually called the Qube 2, leaving the 2800 to designate the system type. The Qube 2 used the RM5231 microprocessor.

Under an OEM arrangement, the Qube 2 units were also produced by Gateway in the form of the Gateway Micro Server. The casing featured on these units was black instead of cobalt blue.

The Qube 3, released in 2002, used an AMD K6-2 CPU at either 300 MHz or 450 MHz and was the last product in the Qube line.

A fourth Qube model was in development but was never released. However, several models were released in the data center-friendly Cobalt RaQ product line after the Cobalt Qube was discontinued.
