= C60 (band) =

American hard rock band

C60, formerly known as Cobalt 60, was a hard rock band from Boston, Massachusetts.

Three of the band's songs were featured on the Dawson's Creek soundtrack, including "Crazy". "Gone, and "Zombie Lincoln". C60 toured through 2004 and played shows with Kiss, Ted Nugent, Rage Against the Machine, Disturbed, Fuel, De La Soul, Mighty Mighty Bosstones, and others.

== History ==
They formed in 1987 in Boston. Originally known as Cobalt 60, they were forced to change their name because there was already a German band with the same name. They broke up in 1994 after releasing one EP, reuniting in the late 90s.

Following the release of their debut album C60, they won 5 awards at the Boston Music Awards in 2001, including Outstanding New Rock Band, Outstanding Song and Outstanding Club Band.

== Albums ==
=== C60 ===
Their 2000 self-titled debut was produced by Hugo Burnham. It was praised by AllMusic as "quality that can't be denied".
