= Terak =

Terak may refer to:

- Terak Corporation, a defunct American computer company based in Scottsdale, Arizona
  - Terak 8510/a, the company's 1977 graphical workstation
- Terak Township (铁列克乡), a township of Wuqia County in Xinjiang Uygur Autonomous Region, China
- King Terak, a minor Star Wars character
