= SGI Prism =

Supercomputer series

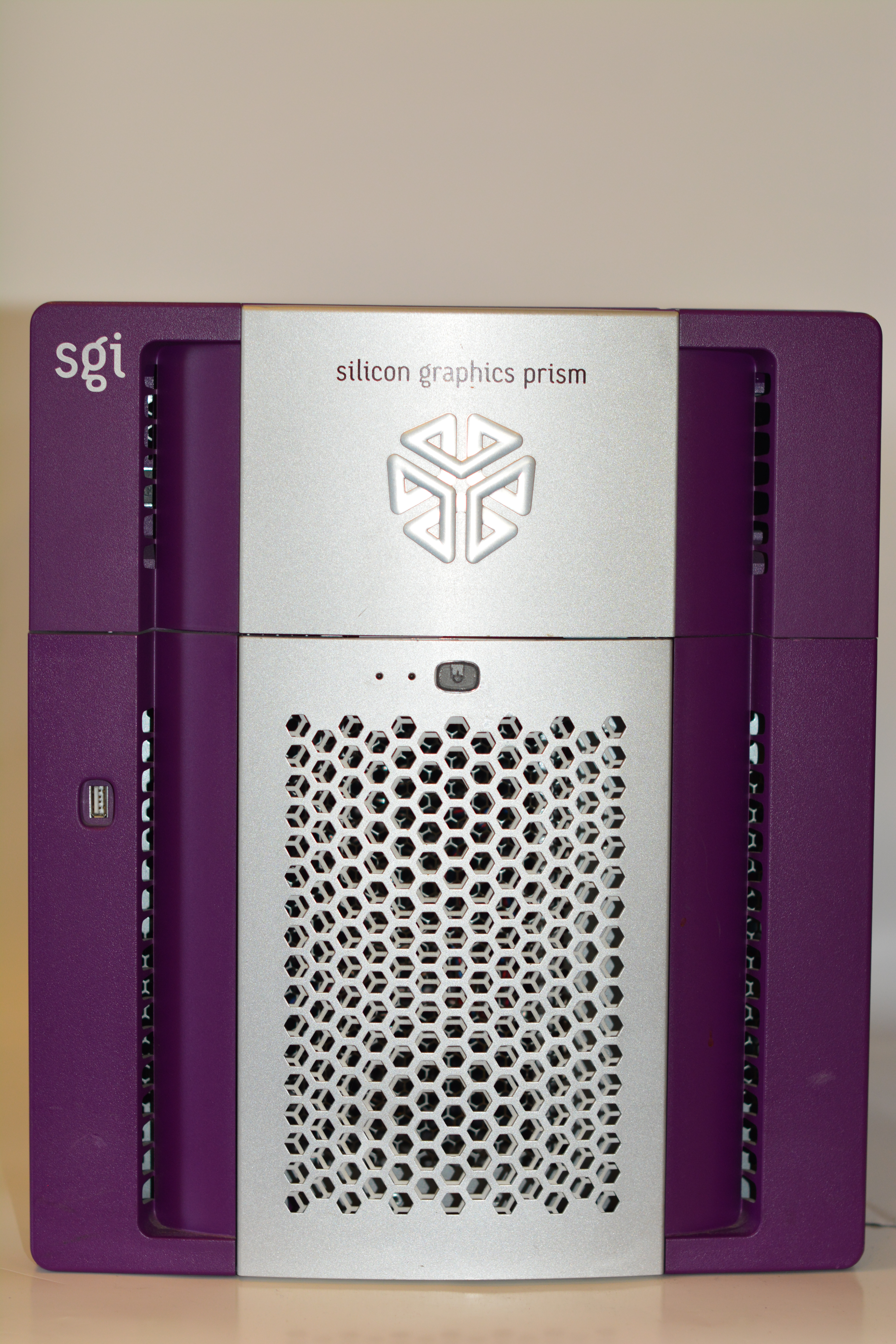
- SGI Prism front
- Manufacturer: Silicon Graphics, Inc.
- Type: Workstation
- Released: April 2005
- Discontinued: 2010
- Operating system: Linux
- CPU: Itanium 2
- Memory: 1 GB to 6.1 TB
- Graphics: FireGL R350, FireGL R420
- Connectivity: USB
- Predecessor: SGI Origin 3000
- Successor: SGI Virtu
- Related: SGI Altix
- Website: http://www.sgi.com/products/visualization/prism/ Archived 2005-12-12 at the Wayback Machine

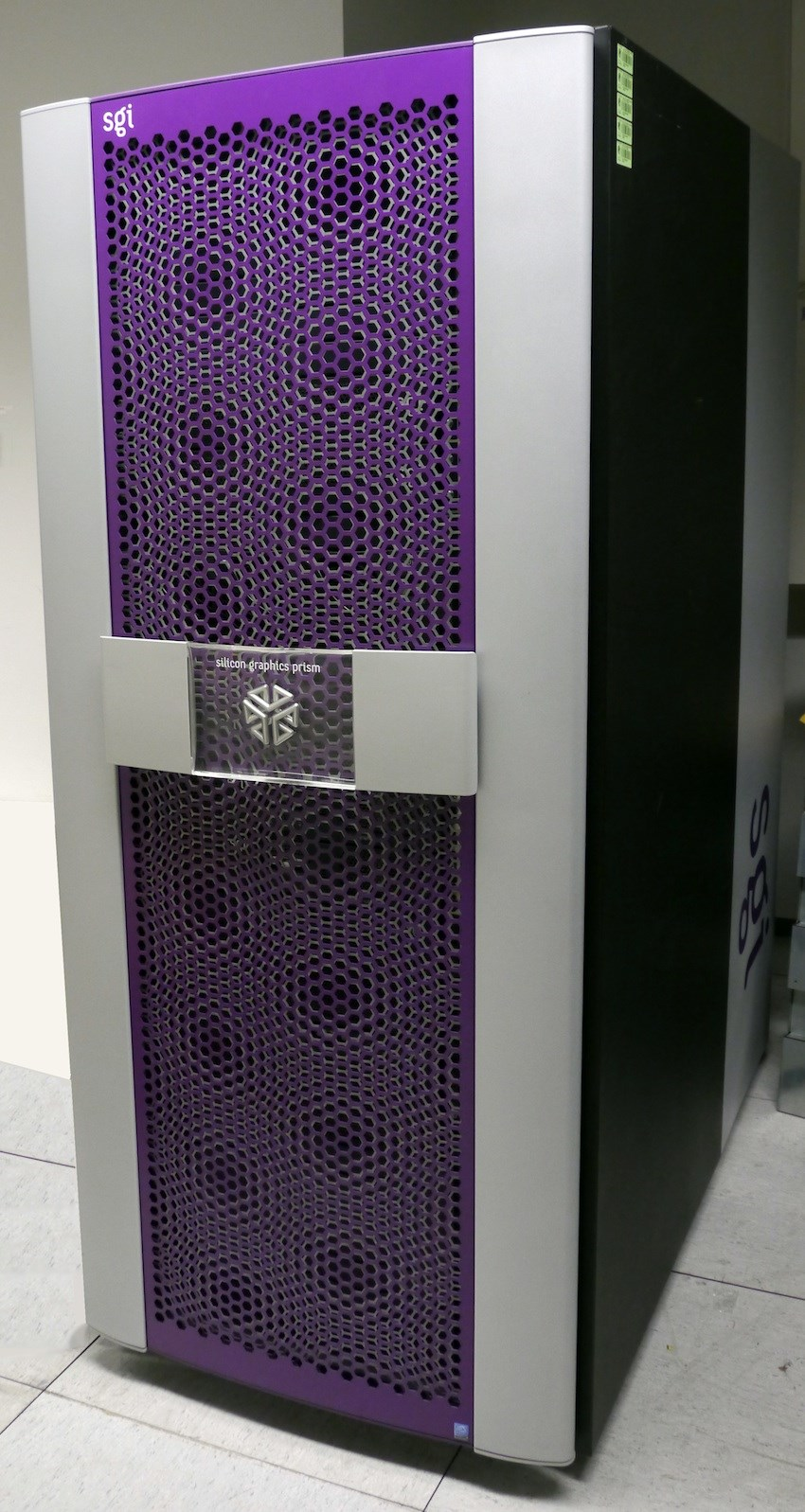
SGI Prism Extreme front

The Silicon Graphics Prism is a series of visualization computer systems developed and manufactured by Silicon Graphics (SGI). Released in April 2005, the Prism's basic system architecture is based on the Altix 3000 servers, but with graphics hardware. The Prism uses the Linux operating system and the OpenGL software library.

Three models of the SGI Prism are Power, Team and Extreme levels.

- The Power level supports two to eight Itanium 2 processors, up to 96 GB of memory and two to four graphics pipelines.
- The Team level supports 8 to 16 Itanium 2 processors, up to 192 GB of memory and four to eight graphics pipelines.
- The Extreme level supports 16 to 256 Itanium 2 processors, up to 3 TB of memory and 4 to 16 graphics pipelines.

The graphics pipelines for the Prism are ATI FireGL cards based on either the R350 or R420 GPUs.
