= Terak Corporation =

Defunct American computer company

- Company type: Public
- Industry: Computers
- Founded: 1975; 50 years ago in Scottsdale, Arizona
- Founders: William Mayberry; Dennis Kodimer; Brian Benzar
- Defunct: July 1985
- Fate: Acquired by Sanders Associates
- Products: Terak 8510/a
- Number of employees: 100 (1980s, peak)

Terak Corporation was an American computer company based in Scottsdale, Arizona. The company was among the first to market graphical workstations, with their most successful being the Terak 8510/a in 1977. After going public in 1983, the company was acquired by Sanders Associates, who placed it under their CalComp division.

== History ==
=== Terak 8000 family (1977–1984) ===
Terak was founded by William Mayberry, Dennis Kodimer, and Brian Benzar in 1975. The name Terak was derived from the word esoteric. Originally a privately owned corporation, Terak employed 40 in 1979. The company spent over a year developing their first product, the Terak 8510, which was released in late 1976.

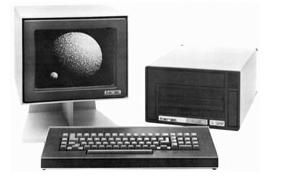
The Terak 8510/a with terminal display and keyboard

The Terak 8510 was a tabletop computer system (alternatively described as a minicomputer and a microcomputer) built from a DEC LSI-11. The chassis that houses the processor contains one 8-inch floppy disk drive, plugged into a controller that supports writing 3740-formatted disks; three additional external drives could be installed (Terak 8512). The 8510 comes with a minimum of 4 KB of memory stock, expandable to 20 KB. A 12-inch CRT-based terminal (the Terak 8530) and series of line printers (the Terak 8540 family) were available as options. The computer was aimed at education and small businesses and had an initial software base comprising a line editor, a linker, a batch processor and a macro assembler, as well as compilers for Fortran IV and BASIC. The company followed up with the graphical Terak 8510/a in December 1977. The 8510/a bumped its predecessor's maximum RAM to 56 KB and included the terminal as standard issue. It was capable of displaying monochrome bitmapped graphics at a resolution of 320 by 240 pixels from any contingent area of memory. As well, it could display text; the computer was also capable of display text and graphics simultaneously, contents overlapping, since both modes of display were independently controlled. The Terak 8510/a was succeeded by the Terak 8600, which featured dual 16-bit microprocessors and Q-Bus slots for expansion. It came with a litany of framebuffer boards, allowing the display of eight colors in the new 640-by-480-pixel and 320-by-240-pixel modes. Additional framebuffer boards could be installed to allow the computer to display 64 colors in 640-by-480-pixel mode.

The company achieved sales of $4 million in 1979 and $6 million in 1980, with the company sales in $8 million in 1981. Although Terak was growing, the rate of growth had been straining the company's cash flow in the backdrop of the early 1980s recession, according to Mayberry, who stated that "[l]ike so many dynamic young companies, our success has been one of our worst enemies." In July 1981, a five-member investment consortium infused Terek with $2.5 million in stock to alleviate the company's growing pains. In August 1983 Terak filed its initial public offering with the SEC with a registration statement filed by Ladenburg Thalmann. It had a peak employee count of 100 in 1984.

=== Bankruptcy and acquisition (1984–1985) ===
In December 1984, Terak laid off 23 salaried employees, 16 of which had been working on a new 32-bit workstation for the company. Terak cited that the end of the product's research and development rendered their employment no longer necessary. In February 1985 Terak declared Chapter 11 bankruptcy after it had defaulted on a credit line the company had with the Bank of Boston. The bank required immediate payment of an outstanding balance of $600,000; when Terak could not pay, the bank declared Terak in default and notified that it exercised the right to collect the $225,000 in funds that Terak had deposited within the bank. The company faced crushing cost-reductions if it would not raise sufficient capital by May 1985, and in March Terak was seeking a better-capitalized company to acquire them partially or in whole in order for the 32-bit workstation to come to market. Meanwhile in bankruptcy protection, Terak published Minn-Draft/PC, a 3D trainer program for users seeking to learn common CADD software for the IBM PC and compatibles. The software was originally developed by the University of Minnesota.

In May 1985, Sanders Associates of Nashua, New Hampshire, agreed to acquire Terak for $3.7 million. The terms of the acquisition were later increased to $5.5 million. Sanders Associates finalized the purchase of Terak in July 1985, putting the new Terek subsidiary under their CalComp division. Terak was one of many CAD/CAM companies struggling financially in 1985; the tech sector in Arizona was also hit particularly hard in that year.
