= Marc Hannah =

American computer graphics designer and engineer

Marc Regis Hannah

Personal details
- Born: October 13, 1956 (age 69) Chicago, Illinois U.S.
- Education: Illinois Institute of Technology (Electrical Engineering); Stanford University (PhD)

Marc Hannah (born October 13, 1956) is an American electrical engineer and computer graphics designer. He is one of the co-founders of Silicon Graphics Inc.

== Early life and education ==
Hannah was born in Chicago, Illinois. Hannah earned a scholarship from Bell Laboratories to attend the Illinois Institute of Technology where he studied Electrical Engineering. Hannah received his B.S. degree in electrical engineering in 1977. Later he attended Stanford University where he obtained his M.S. degree in 1978 and his Ph.D. degree.

== Career ==
At SGI, he was a member of technical staff and a co-founder of the company. He is mostly known for making 3-D chips and for the creation of computer programs like Personal IRIS, Indigo, Indigo2, and Indy graphics. The Geometry Engine established the niche for graphics coprocessors, which run alongside CPUs to handle the heavy math needed to manipulate images. In the 1980s the Geometry Engine would enable the imagery in movies as well as in CAD, scientific visualization, engineering, and countless games. Descendants are now found in nearly every smartphone and computer, where they speed up repetitive calculations from graphics to AI. As Hannah notes, modern chips have a million times more transistors than the Geometry Engine. 3D technology is commonly used in movies, videos, and computers. Some movies that 3D technology is used in are Terminator 2, Jurassic Park, The Hunt for Red October, Beauty and the Beast, Aladdin, and Lawnmower Man. Hannah was one of the 7 founders of Silicon Graphics Incorporated (SGI). SGI is known for its computer graphics. The company went public in 1986 after Hannah and 6 others raised $33 million in venture capital. Marc and his team were tasked with making a 3-D graphic chip which would be used in a video game console. This would become one of the first ever 3-D graphics chips to be used in a video game console. This console went on to become the Nintendo 64. SGI was also used in the process of creating Terminator 2 when George Lucas’ Industrial Light & Magic used Silicon Graphics’ technology to create Terminator 2. Hannah also developed the 3-D special effects systems for scientific research and aerospace biotech engineering labs. Hannah’s designs also helped build the Boeing 777 and modeling systems for biotechnology applications.

== Awards ==
Some of Hannah’s awards and achievements are the Professional Achievement Award from Illinois Institute of Technology, the Professional Achievement Award from the National Technical Association, both of which he received in 1987, and in 1988 he received the Black Engineer of the Year Award.
