= SGI Fuel =

Workstation computer from Silicon Graphics

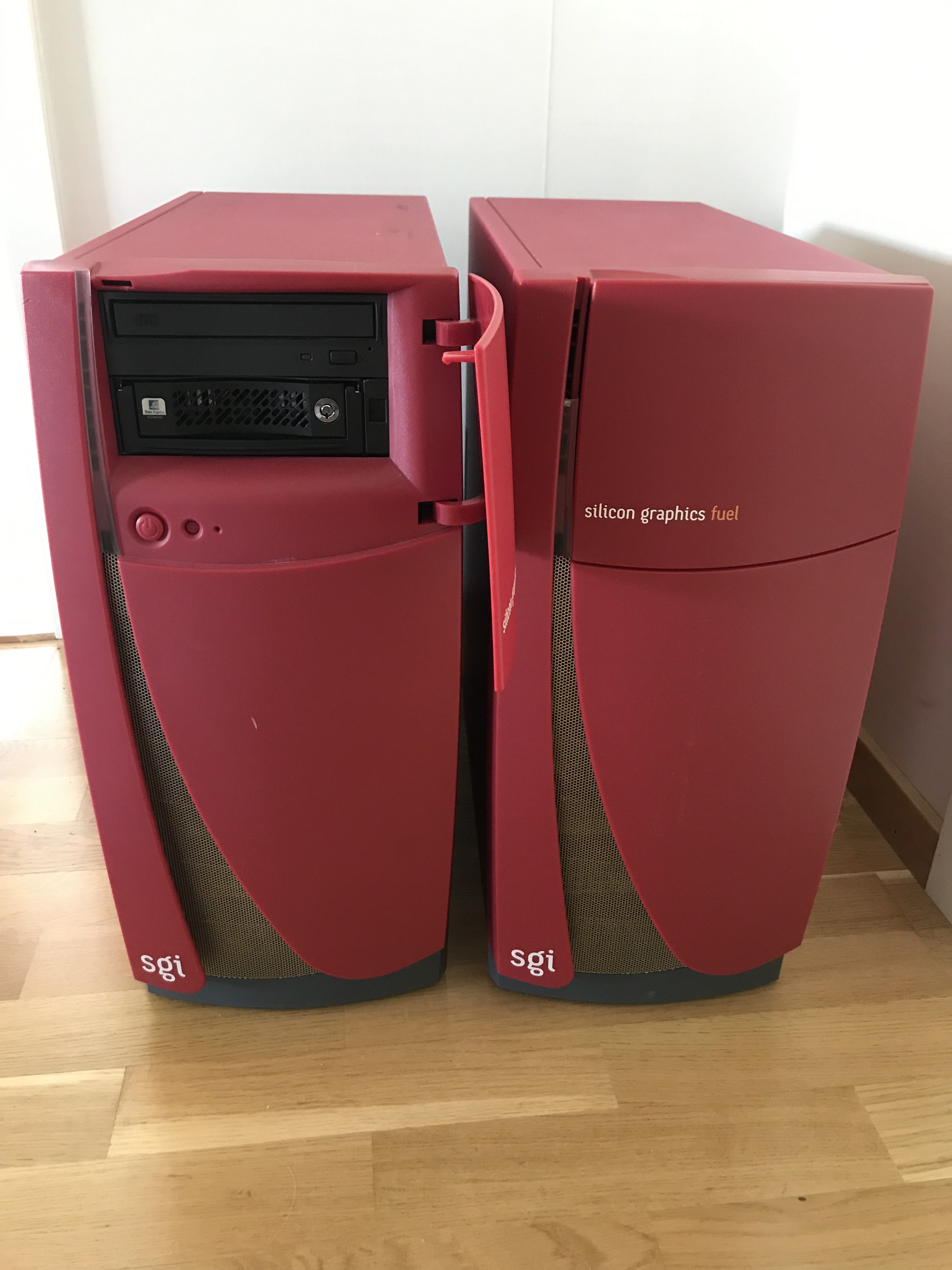
- Manufacturer: Silicon Graphics, Inc.
- Type: Workstation
- Released: January 2002
- Discontinued: December 29, 2006
- Operating system: IRIX
- CPU: R14000 or R16000
- Memory: 512 MB DDR SDRAM (upgradeable to 4 GB)
- Connectivity: USB
- Successor: SGI Virtu
- Related: SGI Tezro
- Website: http://www.sgi.com/products/workstations/fuel/ Archived 2006-12-06 at the Wayback Machine

The SGI Fuel is a mid-range workstation developed and manufactured by Silicon Graphics, Inc. (SGI). It was introduced in January 2002, with a list price of US$11,495. Together with the entire MIPS platform, general availability for the Fuel ended on December 29, 2006. An equivalent product for the same market segment was not provided until 2008, when the Virtu product line was introduced, based on x86 microprocessors and Nvidia graphics.

The Fuel is sometimes perceived as the successor to the SGI O2, but it is not (SGI never made a new low-end system after O2). The Fuel was SGI's mid-range response to customers who only wanted a uniprocessor system, though the 4 GB RAM limit led to fewer sales than would otherwise have been the case, e.g. customers using ANSYS would have preferred at least 8 GB maximum RAM. Fuel's larger sibling is the SGI Tezro, a system that can have up to four 1 GHz R16000 CPUs with 16 MB L2 each. Both Fuel and Tezro are based on SGI's Origin 3000 architecture.

== Architecture ==
The Fuel is based on the same architecture as the high-end Origin 3000 server. It is essentially a single node, single processor Origin 3000, sharing many of the same features and components.

=== Processors ===
The Fuel features either a R14000 or a R16000 microprocessor. The R14000 is clocked at 500 or 600 MHz, and is accompanied by a 2 or 4 MB L2 cache respectively. The R16000 is clocked at 700, 800 or 900 MHz and is accompanied by a 4 MB L2 cache, except for the 900 MHz variant, which has an 8 MB L2 cache. The speed of the L2 cache is clocked at half the speed of the microprocessor, e.g. 250 MHz with the 500 MHz R14000. The 900 MHz R16000 is extremely rare, perhaps due to SGI's lack of promotion when it was introduced. While the speeds for these processors may seem low for the time, benchmarks show that for certain specialized tasks that involve small data sets, a Fuel with a 700 MHz R16000 can be equivalent to a 3.0 GHz Pentium 4 (e.g. C-Ray).

The 700 MHz R16000 became available on January 9, 2003.

=== Memory ===
The Fuel includes 512 MB of memory as standard. Using proprietary DDR SDRAM DIMMs, it can be upgraded to a maximum of 4 GB via four slots in two banks.

=== Graphics ===
The Fuel ships with two alternative VPro graphics options, the V10 and V12. V10 has 32 MB combined memory, V12 has 128 MB combined memory. In both cases, memory that is not being used for display is available for use as texture memory. The V12 supports high quality 48-bit RGBA imaging and both options support hardware-accelerated 2D imaging using the OpenGL ARB extensions (real-time rotation, zoom, pan, feature adjustments). The mplayer application uses the 3D graphics hardware to accelerate movie playback, giving good support for DivX, MPEG4 and other formats.

=== Audio ===
In its standard configuration, the Fuel does not come with any audio hardware, although speakers may be attached via a Universal Serial Bus sound card. The most common solution to add audio capabilities is to install a M-Audio Revolution 7.1 PCI sound card, although the Sound Blaster Audigy 2 ZS can also be used. Additional audio options using PCI expansion cards are available.

=== Expansion ===
The Fuel has four 64-bit 3.3V PCI slots for expansion, two of which run at 33 MHz and two of which run at 66 MHz. The system also has two internal Ultra160 SCSI busses, with space for two internal 5.25" devices and three internal hard disks. The Fuel usually shipped with 10,000 RPM SCSI disks, but it can take good advantage of 15,000 RPM models, with sustained bandwidths up to three times faster than is possible with Octane2's internal UW bus. The Fuel was also the first SGI system to support USB devices in IRIX, although audio and HID USB devices were the only ones supported.

== Operating System ==
The SGI Fuel is only officially capable of running SGI's IRIX operating system. Support begins with IRIX version 6.5.17.
