= SGI Tezro =

Workstation computer series

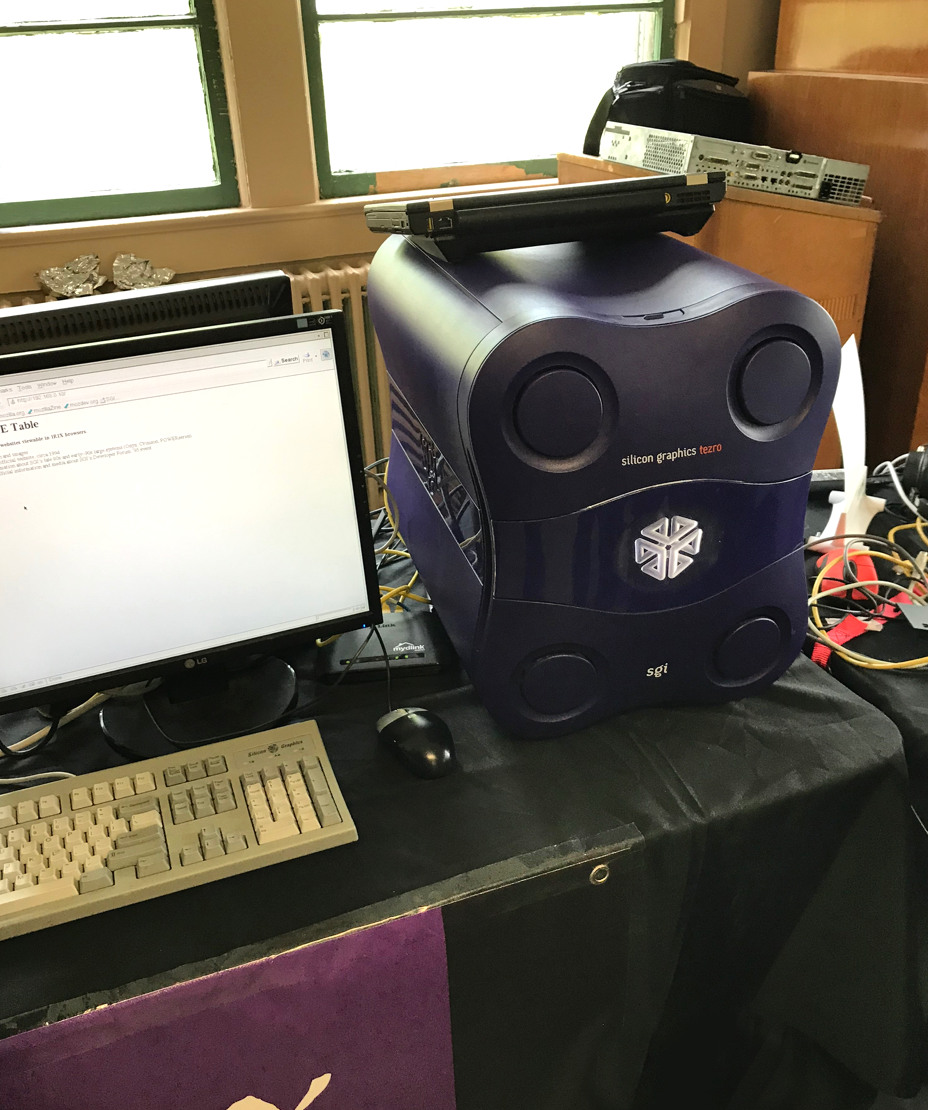
- Manufacturer: Silicon Graphics, Inc.
- Type: Workstation
- Released: June 2003
- Discontinued: December 25, 2006
- Operating system: IRIX
- CPU: MIPS R16000
- Memory: 512 MB DDR SDRAM (upgradeable to 8 GB)
- Connectivity: USB
- Predecessor: SGI Octane2
- Successor: SGI Virtu
- Related: SGI Fuel
- Website: http://www.sgi.com/products/workstations/tezro/ Archived 2006-12-06 at the Wayback Machine

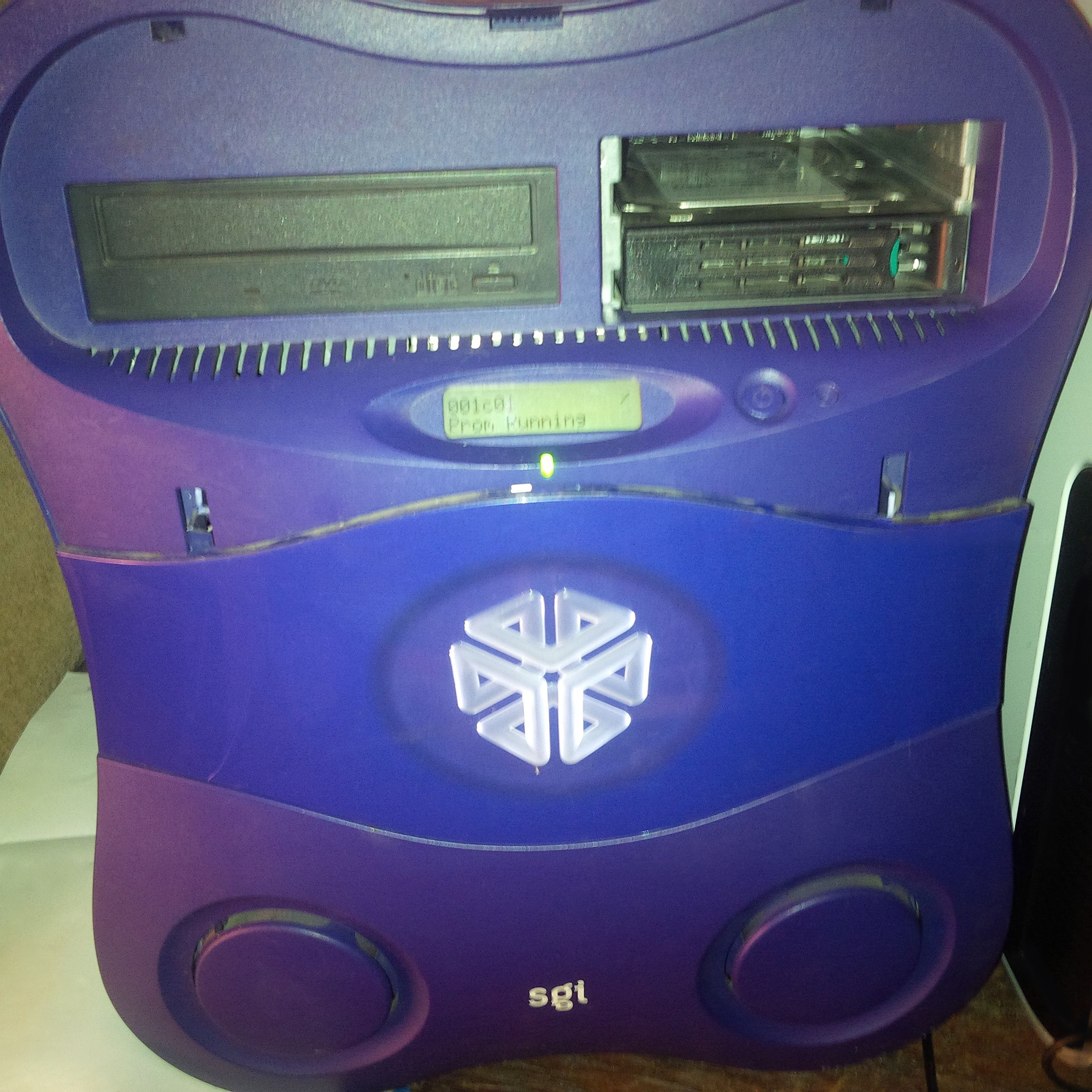
SGI Tezro front

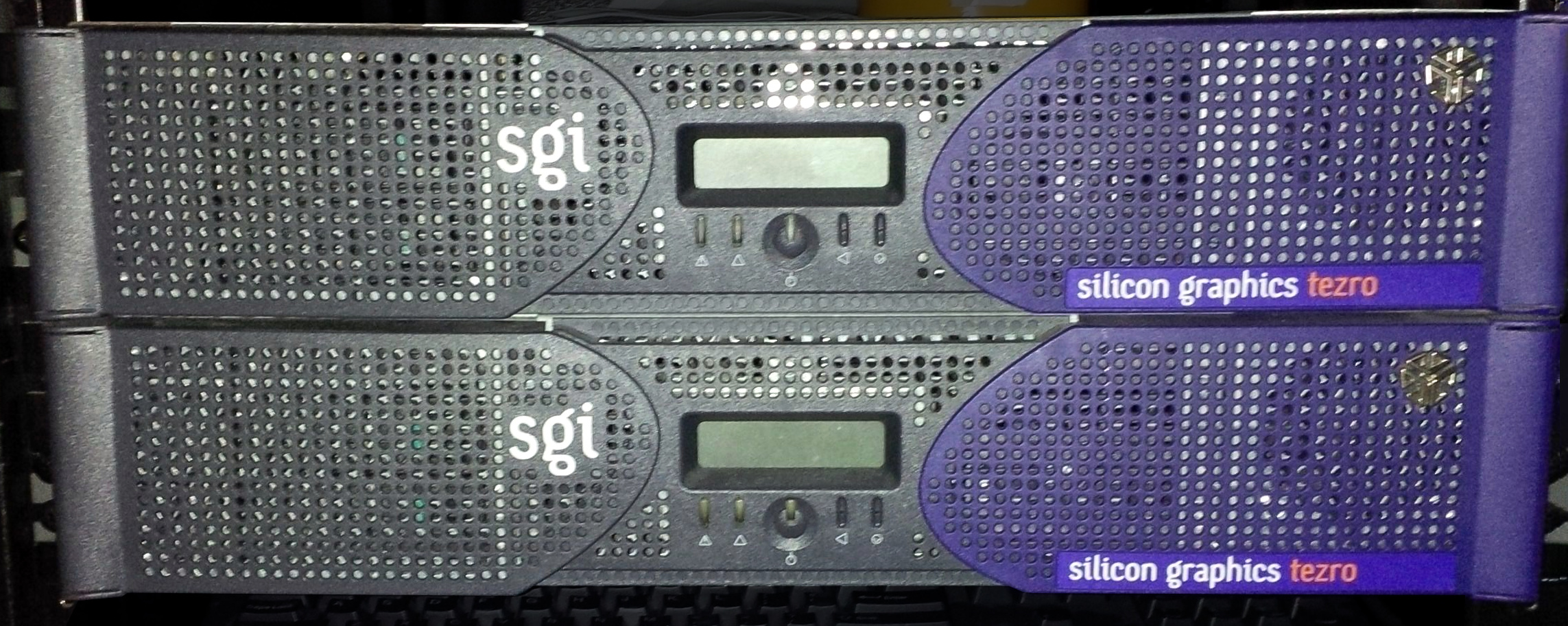
SGI Tezro workstation - rack mount version

The SGI Tezro is a series of high-end computer workstations sold by SGI from 2003 until 2006. Using MIPS CPUs and running IRIX, it is the immediate successor to the SGI Octane line. The systems were produced in both rack-mount and tower versions, and the series was released in June 2003 with a list price of US$20,500. The Tezro was released alongside the SGI Onyx 4 and rack-mountable Tezros share many components with it, including plastic skins. The rack-mounted Tezros are functionally very similar to an Infinite Performance-equipped SGI Onyx350. Tezro marked the return of the original cube logo to SGI machines.

It was replaced in 2008 by the SGI Virtu product line.

== Technical specifications ==
=== Architecture ===
Similar to other SGI systems, the Tezro uses a non-blocking crossbar interconnect to connect all subsystems together. Tezro is based on SGI's Origin 3000 architecture.

ARCS is provided as the boot firmware, as with other SGI computer systems of that era.

=== Processors ===
Tezro systems use two or four 64-bit MIPS R16000 microprocessors.

The following R16000 processor types were available options:

L2 Cache:	Dual (MHz):	Quad (MHz):
4 MB	700; 800	700; 800
8 MB	700; 800	700; 800
16 MB	1000	1000

Node boards from Onyx/Origin 350/3900 systems are compatible and use the same RAM. For example, a quad-R16K/700 MHz (8 MB L2) board from a CX-Brick will work in a Tezro; likewise, other boards up to the same quad-1 GHz edition.

=== Memory ===
The Tezro shipped with 512 MB of DDR SDRAM. It can be expanded using proprietary DIMMs. The tower version can hold up to 8 GB of main memory total, and the rack version can hold up to 8 GB per brick (2 bricks can be directly linked by NUMAlink cables, or up to 8 with the use of a NUMAlink Router).

=== Graphics ===
Tezro supports the VPro V10 and V12 graphics options. Dual-channel options were produced for the desktop variants allowing up to two 1920x1200 displays, while dual-head, dual-channel were available for the rack version, allowing a fully equipped rackmount Tezro to drive up to four 1920x1200 displays at once.

=== Audio ===
Tower systems shipped with analog audio output as standard, and PCI cards provide audio capabilities (including 2-channel 24-bit AES and 8-channel ADAT connectors) on rack-mountable versions.

== Expansion ==
The number of available 64-bit PCI slots included in a Tezro system depends upon the number of CPUs installed in the system:

- 7 133/100 MHz slots in two- or four-CPU tower systems
- 3 133/100 MHz slots in single-CPU tower systems
- 6 100 MHz slots and two 66 MHz slots in 4U rackmountable systems
- 2 100 MHz slots and one 66 MHz slot in 2U rackmountable systems.

All PCI slots in each Tezro model are 3.3V card slots.

A single U160 SCSI connector was produced for attaching external peripherals, as was an optional FireWire card.
