= Nvidia Quadro Plex =

External graphics processing unit

The Nvidia Quadro Plex is an external graphics processing unit (Visual Computing System) designed for large-scale 3D visualizations. The system consists of a box containing a pair of high-end Nvidia Quadro graphics cards featuring a variety of external video connectors. A special PCI Express card is installed in the host computer, and the two are connected by VHDCI cables.

== Specifications ==
The Nvidia Quadro Plex system supports up to four GPUs per unit. It connects to the host PC via a small form factor PCI Express card connected to the host, and a 2-meter (6.6-foot) Nvidia Quadro Plex Interconnect Cable. The system is housed in an external case that is approximately 9.49 inches in height, 5.94 inches in width, and 20.55 inches in depth and weighs about 19 pounds. The system relies heavily on Nvidia's SLI technology.

Quadro Plex	Quadro Chip	# Quadro GPU	# CUDA Cores	Total Frame Buffer	Display Channels	DisplayPort	FSAA (Max per Channel)	Power Consumption (Watts)	Acoustics	Form Factor	Notes
1000 Model ll	Quadro FX 4500	4	384	2GB (512MB/GPU)	8 Dual-link DVI		64x SLI FSAA	640	40dB	Deskside or 3U Rackmount Kit	Host Connection: 2M (6.5 foot) NVIDIA Quadro Plex Interconnect Cable
1000 Model lV	Quadro FX 5600	2	256	3GB (1.5GB/GPU)	4 Dual-link DVI		64x SLI FSAA	640	40dB	Deskside or 3U Rackmount Kit	Host Connection: 2M (6.5 foot) NVIDIA Quadro Plex Interconnect Cable
2100 D4	Quadro FX 4700 X2	4	512	4GB (1GB/GPU)	8 Dual-link DVI		128x SLI FSAA	640	40dB	Deskside or 3U Rackmount Kit	Host Connection: 2M (6.5 foot) NVIDIA Quadro Plex Interconnect Cable
2200 D2	Quadro FX 5800	2	480	8GB (4GB/GPU)	4 Dual-link DVI	2	64x SLI FSAA	640	40dB	Deskside or 3U Rackmount Kit	Host Connection: 2M (6.5 foot) NVIDIA Quadro Plex Interconnect Cable
2100 S4	Quadro FX 5600	4	512	6GB (1.5GB/GPU)			32x FSAA	1200	Idle 45 dB, Max 72 dB	1U Server	Host Connection: 0.5M or 2.0M Quadro Plex Interconnect Cable
2200 S4	Quadro FX 5800	4	960	16GB (4GB/GPU)			32x FSAA	600	Idle 45 dB, Max 72 dB	1U Server	Host Connection: 0.5M or 2.0M Quadro Plex Interconnect Cable
7000	Quadro 6000	2	1024	12GB (6GB/GPU)	4 Dual-link DVI		128x FSAA(with SLI)	600	Max 32 dB	Deskside or 3U Rackmount Kit	Host Connection: 0.5M or 2.0M Quadro Plex Interconnect Cable

== Targeted audiences ==
The Plex is aimed at large CGI animation companies, such as Pixar and DreamWorks Animation. This product is one of several professional graphics solutions on the market today, along with ATI's FireGL and Matrox's professional graphics cards.

== See also ==
- Sun Visualization System - uses Nvidia Quadro Plex for 3D rendering and graphics acceleration
- SGI Virtu VS product line - supports Quadro Plex
