= Silicon Graphics =

1981–2009 American computing company

Silicon Graphics, Inc.

- Headquarters on Amphitheatre Parkway, after it became the Googleplex, c. 2006
- Type: Public
- Traded as: NYSE: SGI; OTC Pink: SGID.pk; Nasdaq: SGIC
- Industry: Computer hardware and software
- Founded: November 9, 1981; 45 years ago Mountain View, California, U.S.
- Defunct: May 11, 2009; 17 years ago
- Fate: Chapter 11 bankruptcy; assets acquired by Rackable Systems, which renamed itself Silicon Graphics International Corp.
- Headquarters: Sunnyvale, California, U.S.
- Key people: Jim Clark; Marc Hannah; Wei Yen; Kurt Akeley; Ed McCracken; Thomas Jermoluk; Rick Belluzzo
- Products: High-performance computing, visualization and storage

Silicon Graphics, Inc. (stylized as SiliconGraphics before 1999, later rebranded SGI, historically known as Silicon Graphics Computer Systems or SGCS) was an American high-performance computing manufacturer, producing computer hardware and software. Founded in Mountain View, California, in November 1981 by James H. Clark, the computer scientist and entrepreneur perhaps best known for founding Netscape (with Marc Andreessen). Its initial market was 3D graphics computer workstations, but its products, strategies and market positions developed significantly over time.

Early systems were based on the Geometry Engine that Clark and Marc Hannah had developed at Stanford University, and were derived from Clark's broader background in computer graphics. The Geometry Engine was the first very-large-scale integration (VLSI) implementation of a geometry pipeline, specialized hardware that accelerated the "inner-loop" geometric computations needed to display three-dimensional images. For much of its history, the company focused on 3D imaging and was a major supplier of both hardware and software in this market.

Silicon Graphics reincorporated as a Delaware corporation in January 1990. Through the mid to late-1990s, the rapidly improving performance of commodity Wintel machines began to erode SGI's stronghold in the 3D market. The porting of Maya to other platforms was a major event in this process. SGI made several attempts to address this, including a disastrous move from its existing MIPS platforms to the Intel Itanium, as well as introducing its own Linux-based Intel IA-32 based workstations and servers that failed in the market. In the mid-2000s the company repositioned itself as a supercomputer vendor, a move that also failed.

On April 1, 2009, SGI filed for Chapter 11 bankruptcy protection and announced that it would sell substantially all of its assets to Rackable Systems, a deal finalized on May 11, 2009, with Rackable assuming the name Silicon Graphics International. The remnants of Silicon Graphics, Inc. became Graphics Properties Holdings, Inc.

== History ==
Silicon Graphics logo with distinctive 3D box "The Bug", used until 1999. The logo was intended to achieve an optical illusion reminiscent of the Necker cube, with its two-dimensional interpretation being that of a "stylized flower".

=== Early years ===
James H. Clark left his position as an electrical engineering associate professor at Stanford University to found SGI in 1982 along with a group of seven graduate students and research staff from Stanford University: Kurt Akeley, David J. Brown, Tom Davis, Rocky Rhodes, Marc Hannah, Herb Kuta, and Mark Grossman; along with Abbey Silverstone and a few others.

=== Growth ===
Ed McCracken was CEO of Silicon Graphics from 1984 to 1997. During those years, SGI grew from annual revenues of $5.4 million to $3.7 billion. Silicon Graphics systems dominated the market for high-speed rendering of three-dimensional graphics, an area rivals like IBM and Sun Microsystems avoided.

=== Decline ===
The addition of 3D graphic capabilities to PCs, and the ability of clusters of Linux- and BSD-based PCs to take on many of the tasks of larger SGI servers, ate into SGI's core markets. The porting of Maya to Linux, Mac OS and Microsoft Windows further eroded the low end of SGI's product line.

In response to challenges faced in the marketplace and a falling share price, Ed McCracken was fired and SGI brought in Richard Belluzzo to replace him. Under Belluzzo's leadership a number of initiatives were taken which are considered to have accelerated the corporate decline.

One such initiative was trying to sell workstations running Windows NT called Visual Workstations in addition to workstations running IRIX, the company's version of UNIX. This put the company in even more direct competition with the likes of Dell, making it more difficult to justify a price premium. The product line was unsuccessful and abandoned a few years later.

SGI's premature announcement of its migration from MIPS to Itanium and its abortive ventures into IA-32 architecture systems (the Visual Workstation line, the ex-Intergraph Zx10 range and the SGI 1000-series Linux servers) damaged SGI's credibility in the market.

In 1999, in an attempt to clarify its current market position as more than a graphics company, Silicon Graphics Inc. changed its corporate identity to "SGI", although its legal name was unchanged.

At the same time, SGI announced a new logo consisting of only the letters "sgi" in a proprietary font called "SGI", created by branding and design consulting firm Landor Associates, in collaboration with designer Joe Stitzlein. SGI continued to use the "Silicon Graphics" name for its workstation product line, and later re-adopted the cube logo for some workstation models.

In November 2005, SGI announced that it had been delisted from the New York Stock Exchange because its common stock had fallen below the minimum share price for listing on the exchange. SGI's market capitalization dwindled from a peak of over seven billion dollars in 1995 to just $120 million at the time of delisting. In February 2006, SGI noted that it could run out of cash by the end of the year.

=== Re-emergence ===
In mid-2005, SGI hired Alix Partners to advise it on returning to profitability and received a new line of credit. SGI announced it was postponing its scheduled annual December stockholders meeting until March 2006. It proposed a reverse stock split to deal with the de-listing from the New York Stock Exchange.

In January 2006, SGI hired Dennis McKenna as its new CEO and chairman of the board of directors. Mr. McKenna succeeded Robert Bishop, who remained vice chairman of the board of directors.

On May 8, 2006, SGI announced that it had filed for Chapter 11 bankruptcy protection for itself and U.S. subsidiaries as part of a plan to reduce debt by $250 million. Two days later, the U.S. Bankruptcy Court approved its first day motions and its use of a $70 million financing facility provided by a group of its bondholders. Foreign subsidiaries were unaffected.

On September 6, 2006, SGI announced the end of development for the MIPS/IRIX line and the IRIX operating system. Production would end on December 29 and the last orders would be fulfilled by March 2007. Support for these products would end after December 2013.

SGI emerged from bankruptcy protection on October 17, 2006. Its stock symbol on Pink Sheets at that point, SGID, was canceled, and new stock was issued on the NASDAQ exchange under the symbol SGIC. This new stock was distributed to the company's creditors, and the SGID common stockholders were left with worthless shares. At the end of that year, the company moved its headquarters from Mountain View to Sunnyvale. Its earlier North Shoreline headquarters is now occupied by the Computer History Museum; the newer Amphitheatre Parkway headquarters was sold to Google (which had already subleased and moved into the facility in 2003). Both of these locations were award-winning designs by Studios Architecture.

In February 2008 SGI acquired Linux Networx, a small Linux based HPC company specializing in x86 based HPC servers.

In April 2008, SGI re-entered the visualization market with the SGI Virtu range of visualization servers and workstations, which were re-badged systems from BOXX Technologies based on Intel Xeon or AMD Opteron processors and Nvidia Quadro graphics chipsets, running Red Hat Enterprise Linux, SUSE Linux Enterprise Server or Windows Compute Cluster Server.

=== Final bankruptcy and acquisition by Rackable Systems ===
In December 2008, SGI received a delisting notification from NASDAQ, as its market value had been below the minimum $35 million requirement for 10 consecutive trading days, and also did not meet NASDAQ's alternative requirements of a minimum stockholders' equity of $2.5 million or annual net income from continuing operations of $500,000 or more.

On April 1, 2009, SGI filed for Chapter 11 again, and announced that it would sell substantially all of its assets to Rackable Systems for $25 million. The sale, ultimately for $42.5 million, was finalized on May 11, 2009; at the same time, Rackable announced its adoption of "Silicon Graphics International" as its global name and brand. The Bankruptcy Court scheduled continuing proceedings and hearings for June 3 and 24, 2009, and July 22, 2009.

After the Rackable acquisition, Vizworld magazine published a series of six articles that chronicle the downfall of SGI.

Hewlett Packard Enterprise acquired Silicon Graphics International in November 2016, which allowed HPE to place the SGI Pleiades, a TOP500 supercomputer at NASA Ames Research Center, in its portfolio.

=== Graphics Properties Holdings, Inc. era ===
During Silicon Graphics Inc.'s second bankruptcy phase, it was renamed to Graphics Properties Holdings, Inc. (GPHI) in June 2009.

In 2010, GPHI announced it had won a significant favorable ruling in its litigation with ATI Technologies and AMD in June 2010, following the patent lawsuit originally filed during the Silicon Graphics, Inc. era. Following the 2008 appeal by ATI over the validity of U.S. patent 6,650,327 ('327) and Silicon Graphics Inc's voluntary dismissal of the U.S. patent 6,885,376 ('376) patent from the lawsuit, the Federal Circuit upheld the jury verdict on the validity of GPHI's U.S. Patent No. 6,650,327, and furthermore found that AMD had lost its right to challenge patent validity in future proceedings. On January 31, 2011, the District Court entered an order that permits AMD to pursue its invalidity affirmative defense at trial and does not permit SGI to accuse AMD's Radeon R700 series of graphics products of infringement in this case. On April 18, 2011, GPHI and AMD had entered into a confidential Settlement and License Agreement that resolved this litigation matter for an immaterial amount and that provides immunity under all GPHI patents for alleged infringement by AMD products, including components, software and designs. On April 26, 2011, the Court entered an order granting the parties' agreed motion for dismissal and final judgment.

In November 2011, GPHI filed another patent infringement lawsuit against Apple Inc. in Delaware involving more patents than its original patent infringement case against Apple last November, for alleged violation of U.S. patents 6,650,327 ('327), U.S. patent 6,816,145 ('145) and U.S. patent 5,717,881 ('881).

In 2012, GPHI filed lawsuit against Apple, Sony, HTC Corp, LG Electronics Inc. and Samsung Electronics Co., Research in Motion Ltd. for allegedly violating patent relating to a computer graphics process that turns text and images into pixels to be displayed on screens. Affected devices include Apple iPhone, HTC EVO4G, LG Thrill, Research in Motion Torch, Samsung Galaxy S and Galaxy S II, and Sony Xperia Play smartphones.

- U.S. patent 6,650,327 - 1998 Display system having floating point rasterization and floating point ..
- U.S. patent 6,885,376 - 2002 System, method, and computer program product for near-real time load ..
- U.S. patent 6,816,145 - 1998 Large area wide aspect ratio flat panel monitor having high resolution for ..
- U.S. patent 5,717,881 - 1995 Data processing system for processing one and two parcel instructions

== Technology ==
=== Motorola 680x0-based systems ===
SGI's first generation products, starting with the IRIS (Integrated Raster Imaging System) 1000 series of high-performance graphics terminals, were based on the Motorola 68000 family of microprocessors. The later IRIS 2000 and 3000 models developed into full UNIX workstations.

==== IRIS 1000 series ====
The first entries in the 1000 series (models 1000 and 1200, introduced in 1984) were graphics terminals, peripherals to be connected to a general-purpose computer such as a Digital Equipment Corporation VAX, to provide graphical raster display abilities. They used 8 MHz Motorola 68000 CPUs with 768 kB of RAM and had no disk drives. They booted over the network (via an Excelan EXOS/101 Ethernet card) from their controlling computer. They used the "PM1" CPU board, which was a variant of the board that was used in Stanford University's SUN workstation and later in the Sun-1 workstation from Sun Microsystems. The graphics system was composed of the GF1 frame buffer, the UC3 "Update Controller", DC3 "Display Controller", and the BP2 bitplane. The 1000-series machines were designed around the Multibus standard.

Notably, the systems included the Geometry Engine which had been designed by Jim Clark and Marc Hannah at Stanford University under ARPA contract. It handled vector operations for 3D graphics. It was capable of approximately 6 million operations per second.

Later 1000-series machines, the 1400 and 1500, ran at 10 MHz and had 1.5 MB of RAM. The 1400 had a 72 MB ST-506 disk drive, while the 1500 had a 474 MB SMD-based disk drive with a Xylogics 450 disk controller. They may have used the PM2 CPU and PM2M1 RAM board from the 2000 series. The usual monitor for the 1000 series ran at 30 Hz interlaced. Six beta-test units of the 1400 workstation were produced, and the first production unit (SGI's first commercial computer) was shipped to Carnegie-Mellon University's Electronic Imaging Laboratory in 1984.

==== IRIS 2000 and 3000 series ====
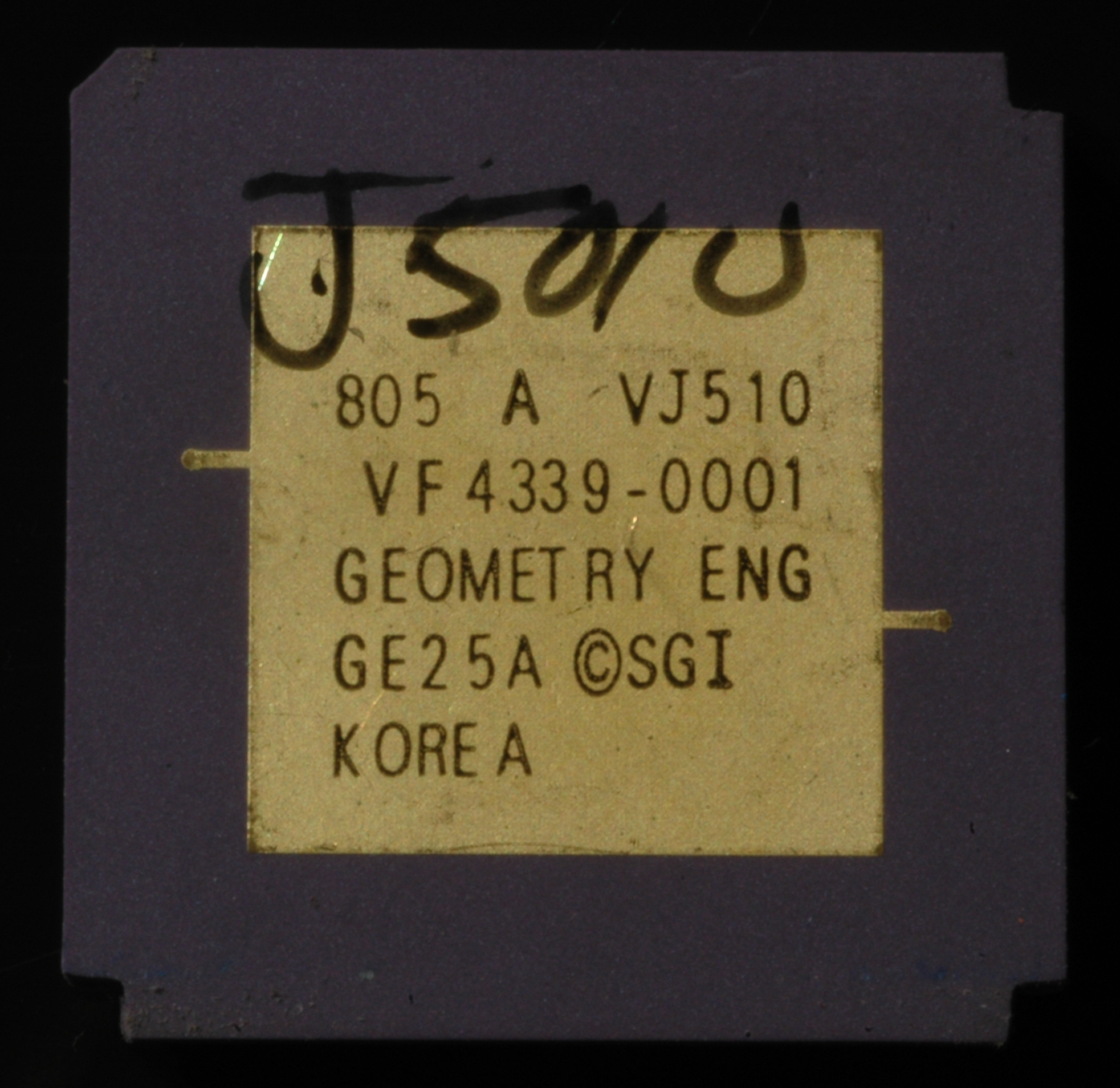
Geometry Engine chip from an IRIS 3120

SGI rapidly developed its machines into workstations with its second product line — the IRIS 2000 series, first released in August 1985. SGI began using the UNIX System V operating system. There were five models in two product ranges, the 2000/2200/2300/2400/2500 range which used 68010 CPUs (the PM2 CPU module), and the later "Turbo" systems, the 2300T, 2400T and 2500T, which had 68020s (the IP2 CPU module). All used the Excelan EXOS/201 Ethernet card, the same graphics hardware (GF2 Frame Buffer, UC4 Update Controller, DC4 Display Controller, BP3 Bitplane). Their main differences were the CPU, RAM, and Weitek Floating Point Accelerator boards, disk controllers and disk drives (both ST-506 and SMD were available). These could be upgraded, for example from a 2400 to a 2400T. The 2500 and 2500T had a larger chassis, a standard 6' 19" EIA rack with space at the bottom for two SMD disk drives weighing approximately 68 kg each. The non-Turbo models used the Multibus for the CPU to communicate with the floating point accelerator, while the Turbos added a ribbon cable dedicated for this. 60 Hz monitors were used for the 2000 series.

The height of the machines using Motorola CPUs was reached with the IRIS 3000 series (models 3010/3020/3030 and 3110/3115/3120/3130, the 30s both being full-size rack machines). They used the same graphics subsystem and Ethernet as the 2000s, but could also use up to 12 Geometry Engines, the first widespread use of hardware graphics accelerators. The standard monitor was a 19" 60 Hz non-interlaced unit with a tilt/swivel base; 19" 30 Hz interlaced and a 15" 60 Hz non-interlaced (with tilt/swivel base) were also available.

The IRIS 3130 and its smaller siblings were impressive for the time, being complete UNIX workstations. The 3130 was powerful enough to support a complete 3D animation and rendering package without mainframe support. With large capacity hard drives by standards of the day (two 300 MB drives), streaming tape and Ethernet, it could be the centerpiece of an animation operation.

The line was formally discontinued in November 1989, with about 3,500 systems shipped of all 2000 and 3000 models combined.

=== RISC era ===
With the introduction of the IRIS 4D series, SGI switched to MIPS microprocessors. These machines were more powerful and came with powerful on-board floating-point capability. As 3D graphics became more popular in television and film during this time, these systems were responsible for establishing much of SGI's reputation.

SGI produced a broad range of MIPS-based workstations and servers during the 1990s, running SGI's version of UNIX System V, now called IRIX. These included the massive Onyx visualization systems, the size of refrigerators and capable of supporting up to 64 processors while managing up to three streams of high resolution, fully realized 3D graphics.

In October 1991, MIPS announced the first commercially available 64-bit microprocessor, the R4000. SGI used the R4000 in its Crimson workstation. IRIX 6.2 was the first fully 64-bit IRIX release, including 64-bit pointers.

To secure the supply of future generations of MIPS microprocessors (the 64-bit R4000), SGI acquired the company in 1992 for $333 million and renamed it as MIPS Technologies Inc., a wholly owned subsidiary of SGI.

In 1993, Silicon Graphics (SGI) signed a deal with Nintendo to develop the Reality Coprocessor (RCP) GPU used in the Nintendo 64 (N64) video game console. The deal was signed in early 1993, and it was later made public in August of that year. The console itself was later released in 1996. The RCP was developed by SGI's Nintendo Operations department, led by engineer Dr. Wei Yen. In 1997, twenty SGI employees, led by Yen, left SGI and founded ArtX (later acquired by ATI Technologies in 2000).

In 1998, SGI relinquished some ownership of MIPS Technologies, Inc in a Re-IPO, and fully divested itself in 2000.

In the late 1990s, when much of the industry expected the Itanium to replace both CISC and RISC architectures in non-embedded computers, SGI announced its intent to phase out MIPS in its systems. Development of new MIPS microprocessors stopped, and the existing R12000 design was extended multiple times until 2003 to provide existing customers more time to migrate to Itanium.

In August 2006, SGI announced the end of production for MIPS/IRIX systems, and by the end of the year MIPS/IRIX products were no longer generally available from SGI.

=== IRIS GL and OpenGL ===
Until the second generation Onyx Reality Engine machines, SGI offered access to its high performance 3D graphics subsystems through a proprietary API known as IRIS Graphics Library (IRIS GL). As more features were added over the years, IRIS GL became harder to maintain and more cumbersome to use. In 1992, SGI decided to clean up and reform IRIS GL and made the bold move of allowing the resulting OpenGL API to be cheaply licensed by SGI's competitors, and set up an industry-wide consortium to maintain the OpenGL standard (the OpenGL Architecture Review Board).

This meant that for the first time, fast, efficient, cross-platform graphics programs could be written. For over 20 years – until the introduction of the Vulkan API – OpenGL remained the only real-time 3D graphics standard to be portable across a variety of operating systems.

=== ACE Consortium ===
SGI was part of the Advanced Computing Environment initiative, formed in the early 1990s with 20 other companies, including Compaq, Digital Equipment Corporation, MIPS Computer Systems, Groupe Bull, Siemens, NEC, NeTpower, Microsoft and Santa Cruz Operation. Its intent was to introduce workstations based on the MIPS architecture and able to run Windows NT and SCO UNIX. The group produced the Advanced RISC Computing (ARC) specification, but began to unravel little more than a year after its formation.

=== Entertainment industry ===
For eight consecutive years (1995–2002), all films nominated for an Academy Award for Distinguished Achievement in Visual Effects were created on Silicon Graphics computer systems. The technology was also used in commercials for a host of companies.

An SGI Crimson system with the fsn three-dimensional file system navigator appeared in the 1993 movie Jurassic Park.

In the movie Twister, protagonists can be seen using an SGI laptop computer; however, the unit shown was not an actual working computer, but rather a fake laptop shell built around an SGI Corona LCD flat screen display.

The 1995 film Congo also features an SGI laptop computer being used by Dr. Ross (Laura Linney) to communicate via satellite to TraviCom HQ.

The purple, lowercased "sgi" logo can be seen at the beginning of the opening credits of the HBO series Silicon Valley, before being taken down and replaced by the Google logo as the intro graphics progress. Google leased the former SGI buildings in 2003 for its headquarters in Mountain View, CA until it purchased the buildings outright in 2006.

Once inexpensive PCs began to have graphics performance close to the more expensive specialized graphical workstations which were SGI's core business, SGI shifted its focus to high performance servers for digital video and the Web. Many SGI graphics engineers left to work at other computer graphics companies such as ATI and Nvidia, contributing to the PC 3D graphics revolution.

=== Free software ===
SGI was a promoter of free software, supporting several projects such as Linux and Samba, and opening some of its own previously proprietary code such as the XFS filesystem and the Open64 compiler.

SGI was also important in its contribution to the C++ Standard Template Library (STL) with many useful extensions in the MIT-like licensed SGI STL implementation. The extension keeps being carried by the direct descendant STLport and GNU's libstdc++.

=== Acquisition of Alias, Wavefront, Cray and Intergraph ===
In 1995, SGI purchased Alias Research, Kroyer Films, and Wavefront Technologies in a deal totaling approximately $500 million and merged the companies into Alias|Wavefront. In June 2004 SGI sold the business, later renamed to Alias/Wavefront, to the private equity investment firm Accel-KKR for $57.5 million. In October 2005, Autodesk announced that it signed a definitive agreement to acquire Alias for $182 million in cash.

In February 1996, SGI purchased the well-known supercomputer manufacturer Cray Research for $740 million, and began to use marketing names such as "CrayLink" for (SGI-developed) technology integrated into the SGI server line. Three months later, it sold the Cray Business Systems Division, responsible for the CS6400 SPARC/Solaris server, to Sun Microsystems for an undisclosed amount (acknowledged later by a Sun executive to be "significantly less than $100 million"). Many of the Cray T3E engineers designed and developed the SGI Altix and NUMAlink technology. SGI sold the Cray brand and product lines to Tera Computer Company on March 31, 2000, for $35 million plus one million shares. SGI also distributed its remaining interest in MIPS Technologies through a spin-off effective June 20, 2000.

In September 2000, SGI acquired the Zx10 series of Windows workstations and servers from Intergraph Computer Systems (for a rumored $100 million), and rebadged them as SGI systems. The product line was discontinued in June 2001.

=== SGI Visual Workstations ===
Another attempt by SGI in the late 1990s to introduce its own family of Intel-based workstations running Windows NT or Red Hat Linux (see also SGI Visual Workstation) proved to be a financial disaster, and shook customer confidence in SGI's commitment to its own MIPS-based line.

=== Switch to Itanium ===
In 1998, SGI announced that future generations of its machines would be based not on its own MIPS processors, but the upcoming "super-chip" from Intel, code-named "Merced" and later called Itanium. Funding for its own high-end processors was reduced, and it was planned that the R10000 would be the last MIPS mainstream processor. MIPS Technologies would focus entirely on the embedded market, where it was having some success, and SGI would no longer have to fund development of a CPU that, since the failure of ARC, found use only in its own machines. The Origin 2000 server line was intended to get nodeboards loaded with Merced. Production and development delays in as early as 1999 made it clear that the Merced release was going to be delivered late. Stopgap MIPS CPUs, all refinements of the successful R10000 such as the R12000, R14000 and R16000 were released. These were used in a series of MIPS servers and workstations from 1999 through 2006.

SGI's first Itanium-based system was the short-lived SGI 750 workstation, launched in 2001. SGI's MIPS-based systems were not to be superseded until the launch of the Itanium 2-based Altix servers and Prism workstations some time later. Unlike the MIPS systems, which ran IRIX, the Itanium systems used SuSE Linux Enterprise Server with SGI enhancements as its operating system. SGI used Transitive Corporation's QuickTransit software to allow its old MIPS/IRIX applications to run (in emulation) on the new Itanium/Linux platform.

In the server market, the Itanium 2-based Altix eventually replaced the MIPS-based Origin product line. In the workstation market, the switch to Itanium was not completed before SGI exited the market.

The Altix was the most powerful computer in the world in 2006, assuming that a "computer" is defined as a collection of hardware running under a single instance of an operating system. The Altix had 512 Itanium processors running under a single instance of Linux. A cluster of 20 machines was then the eighth-fastest supercomputer. All faster supercomputers were clusters, but none have as many FLOPS per machine. However, more recent supercomputers are very large clusters of machines that are individually less capable. SGI acknowledged this and in 2007 moved away from the "massive NUMA" model to clusters.

=== Switch to Xeon ===
Although SGI continued to market Itanium-based machines, its more recent machines were based on the Intel Xeon processor. The first Altix XE systems were relatively low-end machines, but by December 2006 the XE systems were more capable than the Itanium machines by some measures (e.g., power consumption in FLOPS/W, density in FLOPS/m^{3}, cost/FLOPS). The XE1200 and XE1300 servers used a cluster architecture. This was a departure from the pure NUMA architectures of the earlier Itanium and MIPS servers.

In June 2007, SGI announced the Altix ICE 8200, a blade-based Xeon system with up to 512 Xeon cores per rack. An Altix ICE 8200 installed at New Mexico Computing Applications Center (with 14336 processors) ranked at number 3 on the TOP500 list of November 2007.

== User base and core market ==
SGI is known for selling to Hollywood visual effects studios. Nonetheless, SGI's largest revenue has always come from government and defense applications, including energy, and scientific computing. In fact, its largest single sale ever was to the United States Postal Service (USPS), where SGI servers ran an artificial intelligence program that mechanically read, tagged and sorted the mail at several USPS mail centers.

As lower-cost workstations running Linux, Windows and Mac OS X became more capable, and professional software became available on these platforms, SGI's presence in the visual effects industry declined.

== High-end server market ==
SGI continued to enhance its line of servers (including some supercomputers) based on the SN architecture. SN, for Scalable Node, is a technology developed by SGI in the mid-1990s that uses cache-coherent non-uniform memory access (cc-NUMA). In an SN system, processors, memory, and a bus- and memory-controller are coupled together into an entity called a node, usually on a single circuit board. Nodes are connected by a high-speed interconnect called NUMAlink (originally marketed as CrayLink). There is no internal bus, and instead access between processors, memory, and I/O devices is done through a switched fabric of links and routers.

Thanks to the cache coherence of the distributed shared memory, SN systems scale along several axes at once: as CPU count increases, so does memory capacity, I/O capacity, and system bisection bandwidth. This allows the combined memory of all the nodes to be accessed under a single OS image using standard shared-memory synchronization methods. This makes an SN system far easier to program and able to achieve higher sustained-to-peak performance than non-cache-coherent systems like conventional clusters or massively parallel computers which require applications code to be written (or re-written) to do explicit message-passing communication between their nodes.

The first SN system, known as SN-0, was released in 1996 under the product name Origin 2000. Based on the MIPS R10000 processor, it scaled from 2 to 128 processors and a smaller version, the Origin 200 (SN-00), scaled from 1 to 4. Later enhancements enabled systems of as large as 512 processors.

The second generation system, originally called SN-1 but later SN-MIPS, was released in July 2000, as the Origin 3000. It scaled from 4 to 512 processors, and 1,024-processor configurations were delivered by special order to some customers. A smaller, less scalable implementation followed, called Origin 300.

In November 2002, SGI announced a repackaging of its SN system, under the name Origin 3900. It quadrupled the processor area density of the SN-MIPS system, from 32 up to 128 processors per rack while moving to a "fat tree" interconnect topology.

In January 2003, SGI announced a variant of the SN platform called the Altix 3000 (internally called SN-IA). It used Intel Itanium 2 processors and ran the Linux operating system kernel. At the time it was released, it was the world's most scalable Linux-based computer, supporting up to 64 processors in a single system node. Nodes could be connected using the same NUMAlink technology to form what SGI predictably termed "superclusters".

In February 2004, SGI announced general support for 128 processor nodes to be followed by 256 and 512 processor versions that year.

In April 2004, SGI announced the sale of its Alias software business for approximately $57 million.

In October 2004, SGI built the supercomputer Columbia, which broke the world record for computer speed, for the NASA Ames Research Center. It was a cluster of 20 Altix supercomputers each with 512 Intel Itanium 2 processors running Linux, and achieved sustained speed of 42.7 trillion floating-point operations per second (teraflops), easily topping Japan's famed Earth Simulator's record of 35.86 teraflops. (A week later, IBM's upgraded Blue Gene/L clocked in at 70.7 teraflops.)

In July 2006, SGI announced an SGI Altix 4700 system with 1,024 processors and 4 TB of memory running a single Linux system image.

== Hardware products ==
Some 68k- and MIPS-based models were also rebadged by other vendors, including CDC, Tandem Computers, Prime Computer and Siemens-Nixdorf. SGI Onyx and SGI Indy series systems were used for video game development for the Nintendo 64.

=== Motorola 68k-based systems ===
- IRIS 1000 series graphics terminals (diskless 1000/1200, 1400/1500 with disks)
- IRIS 2000 series workstations (2000/2200/2300/2400/2500 non-Turbo and 2300T/2400T/2500T "Turbo" models)
- IRIS 3000 series workstations (3010/3020/3030 and 3110/3115/3120/3130)

=== MIPS-based systems ===
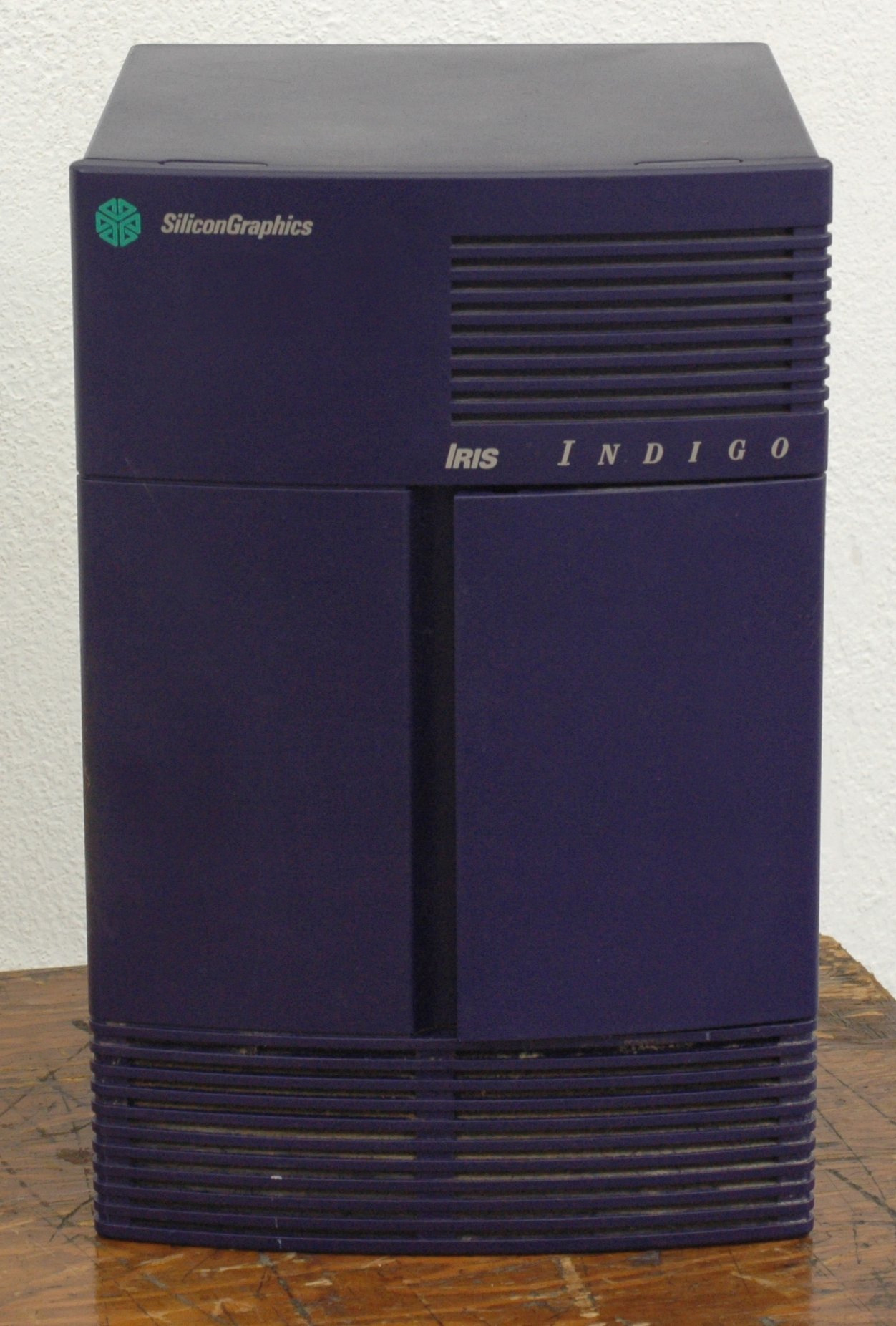
SGI Indigo

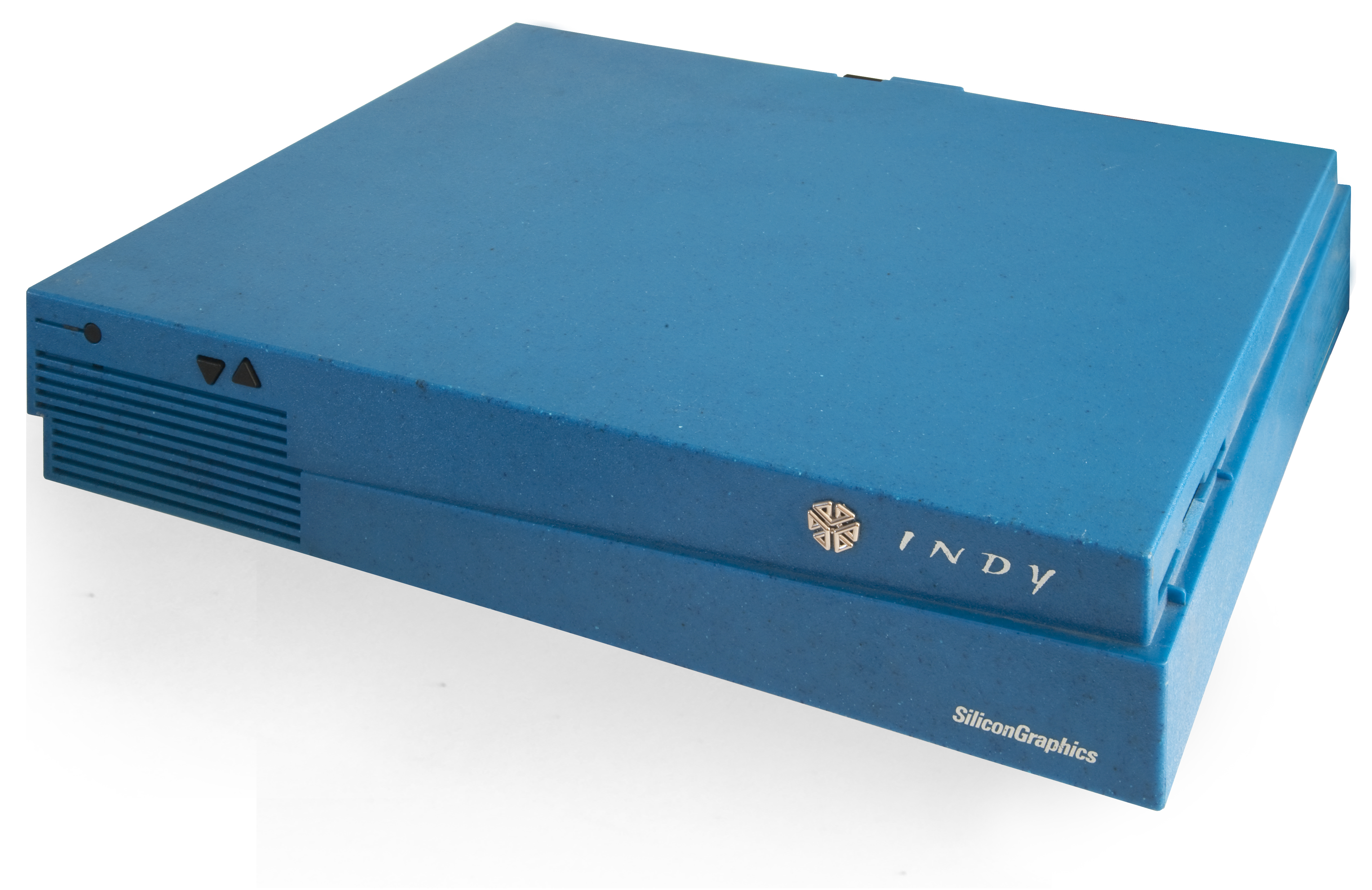
SGI Indy

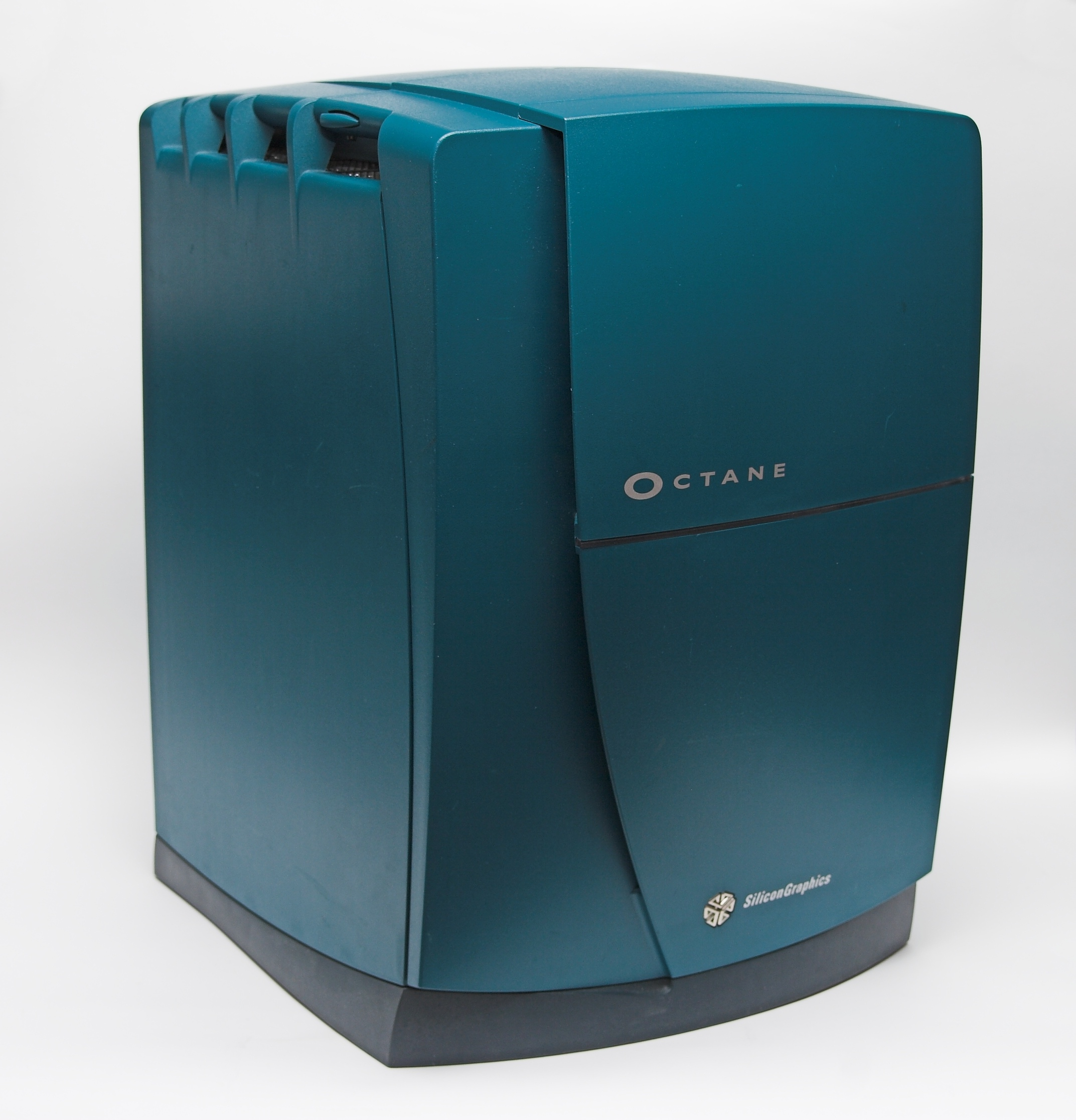
SGI Octane

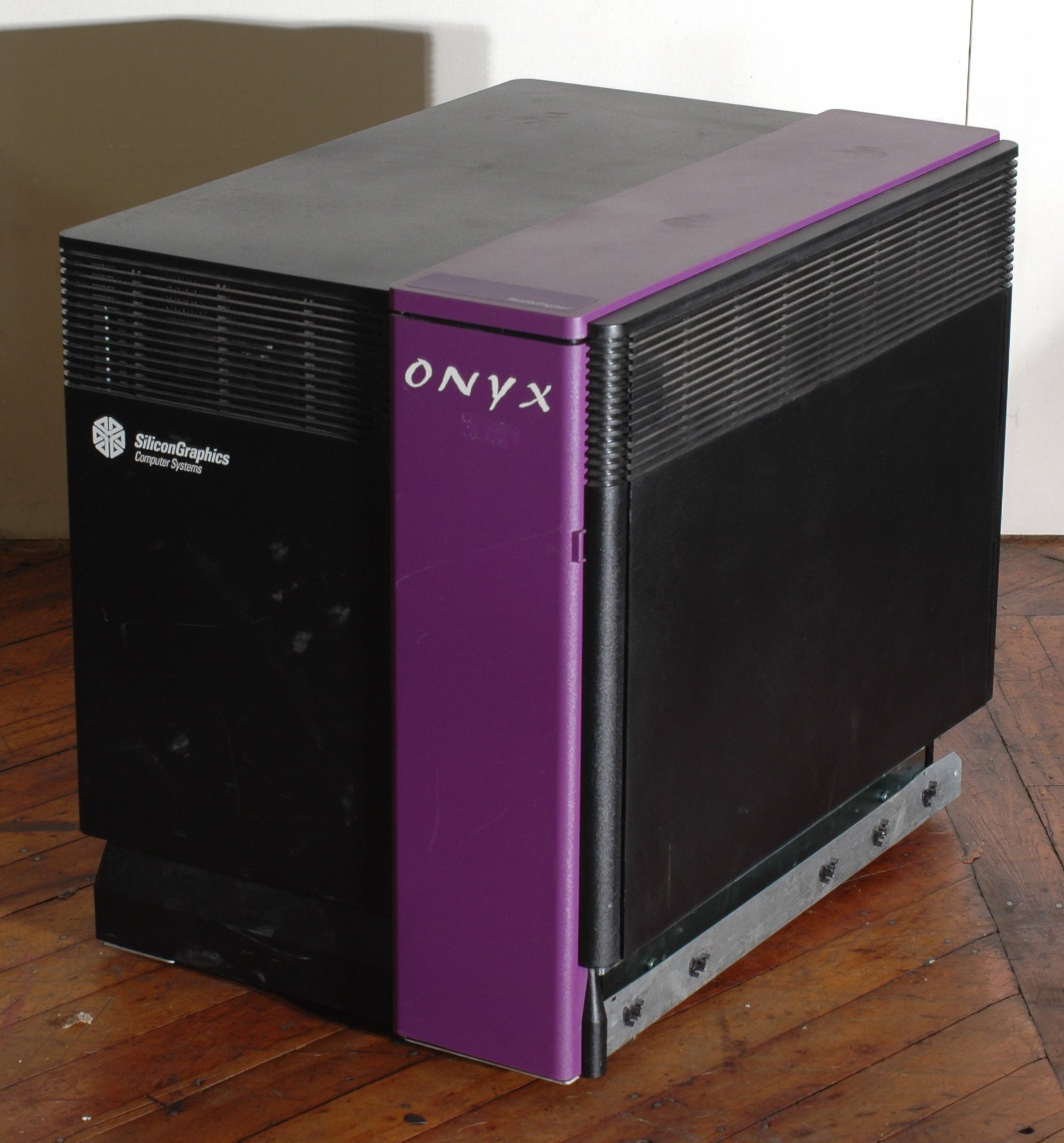
SGI Onyx

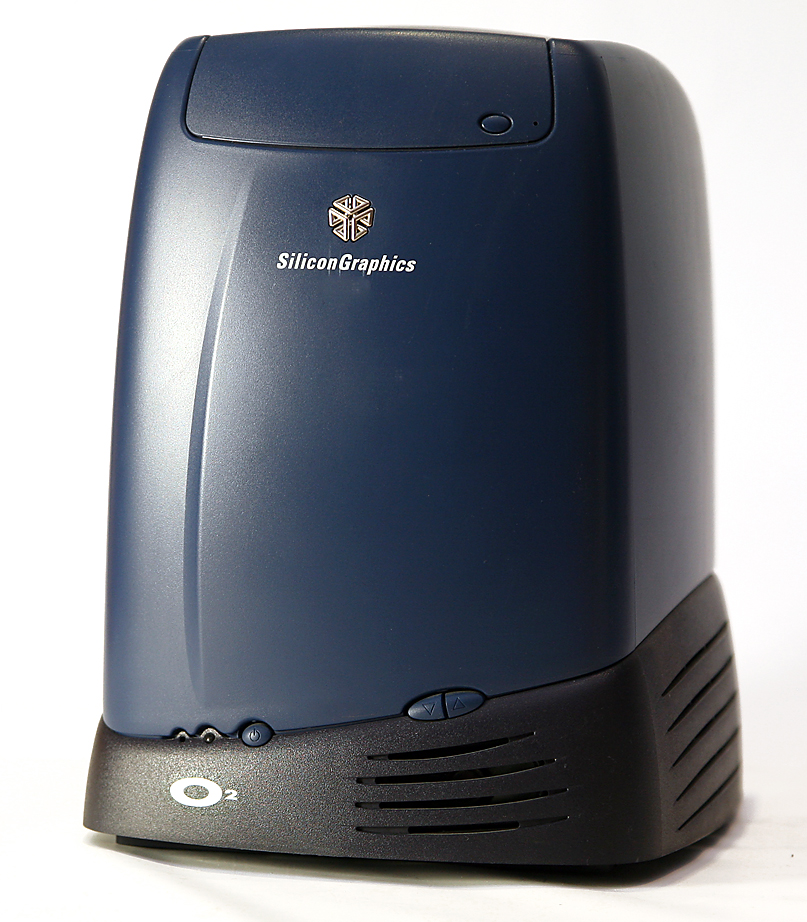
SGI O2

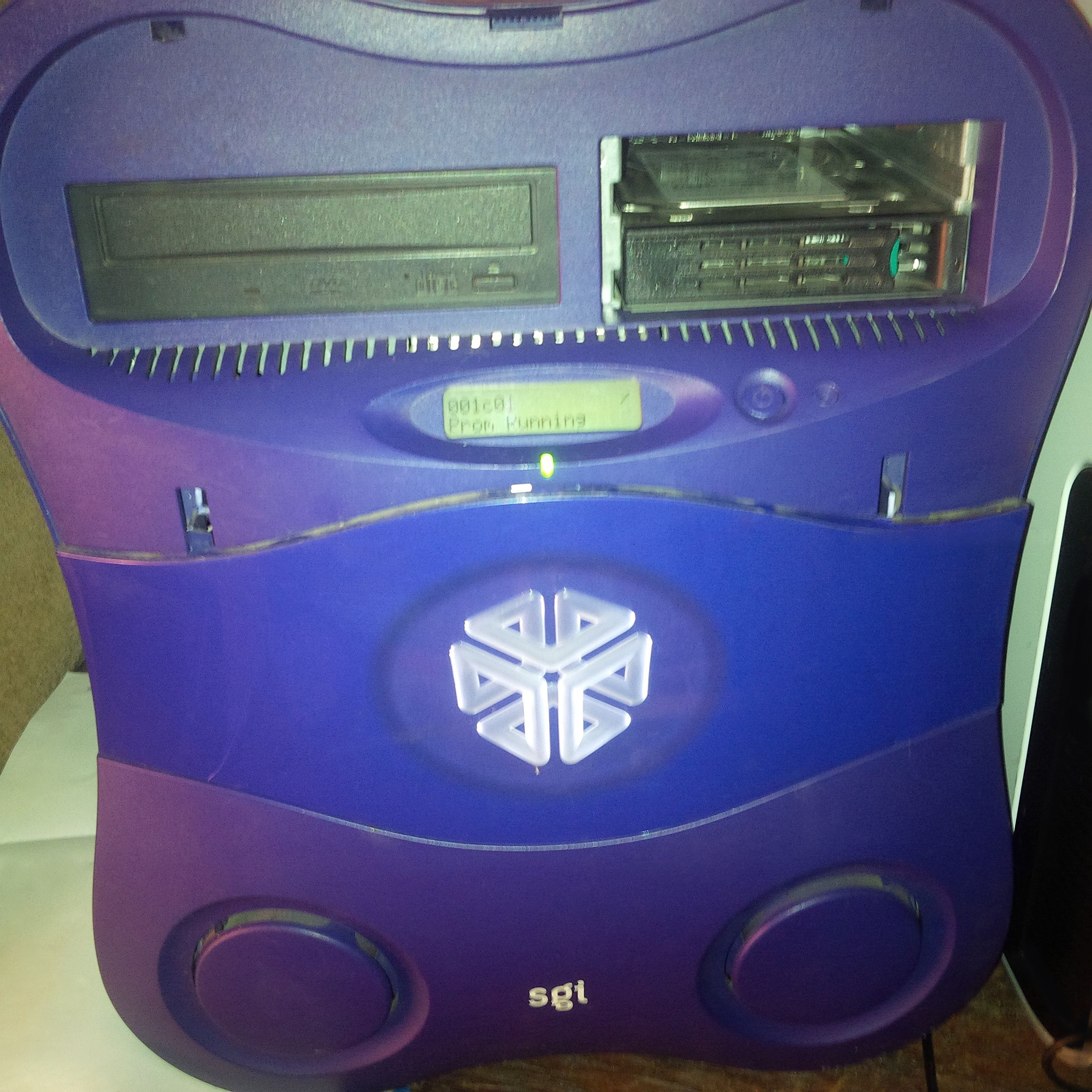
SGI Tezro Workstation

==== Workstations ====
- Professional IRIS series (IRIS 4D/50/60/70/80/85)
- Personal IRIS series (IRIS 4D/20/25/30/35)
- IRIS Power Series (IRIS 4D/1x0/2x0/3x0/4x0)
- IRIS Crimson (deskside workstation/server)
- IRIS Indigo series (Indigo, Indigo R4000)
- Indigo² series (Indigo², Power Indigo², Indigo² R10000)
- Indy workstation
- O2/O2+ workstation
- Octane workstation
- Octane2 workstation
- Fuel entry-level workstation
- Tezro high-end workstation

==== Servers ====
- Challenge S (desktop server)
- Challenge M/Power Challenge M (desktop server)
- Challenge DM (deskside server)
- Challenge L/Power Challenge/Challenge 10000 (deskside server)
- Challenge XL/Power Challenge XL (rack server)
- Origin 200 entry-level server
- Origin 2000 high-end server
- Origin 300 entry-level server
- Origin 350 mid-range server
- Origin 3000 high-end server

==== Visualization ====
- Onyx (deskside and rackmount systems)
- Power Onyx (deskside and rackmount systems)
- Onyx 10000 (deskside and rackmount systems)
- Onyx2 (deskside and rackmount systems)
- Onyx 350 (rackmount systems)
- Onyx 3000 (rackmount systems)
- Onyx4 (rackmount systems)
- SkyWriter (rackmount systems)

=== Intel IA-32-based systems ===
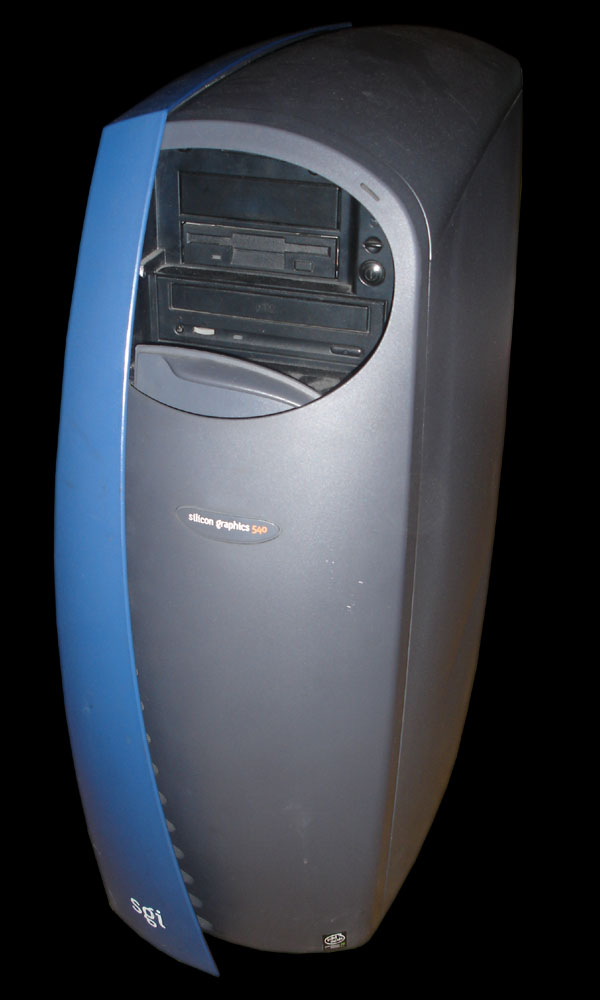
SGI 540 Visual Workstation

==== Workstations ====
- SGI 320 Visual Workstation (Windows NT)
- SGI 540 Visual Workstation (Windows NT)
- SGI 230 Workstation (Linux/Windows NT)
- SGI 330 Workstation (Linux/Windows NT)
- SGI 550 Workstation (Linux/Windows NT)
- SGI Zx10 Visual Workstation (Windows)
- SGI Zx10 VE Visual Workstation (Windows)

==== Servers ====
- SGI Zx10 Server (Windows)
- SGI 1100 server (Linux/Windows)
- SGI 1200 server (Linux/Windows)
- SGI 1400 server (Linux/Windows)
- SGI 1450 server (Linux/Windows)
- SGI Internet Server (Linux)
- SGI Internet Server for E-commerce (Linux)
- SGI Internet Server for Messaging (Linux)

=== Itanium-based systems ===
- SGI 750 workstation
- Altix 330 entry-level server
- Altix 350 mid-range server
- Altix 3000 high-end server
- Altix 450 mid-range server
- Altix 4000 high-end server, capable of up to 2048 CPUs
- Prism (deskside and rackmount systems)

=== Intel/AMD x86-64 systems ===
- Altix XE210 server
- Altix XE240 server
- Altix XE310 server
- Altix XE1200 cluster
- Altix XE1300 cluster
- Altix ICE 8200
- Altix ICE 8400
- Virtu VN200 visualization node
- Virtu VS100 workstation
- Virtu VS200 workstation
- Virtu VS300 workstation
- Virtu VS350 workstation

=== FPGA-based accelerators ===
- RASC Application Acceleration

=== Storage systems ===
- InfiniteStorage 10000
- InfiniteStorage 6700
- InfiniteStorage 4600
- InfiniteStorage 4500
- InfiniteStorage 4000
- InfiniteStorage 350
- InfiniteStorage 220
- InfiniteStorage 120
- SGI Infinite Data Cluster

=== Storage solutions ===
- InfiniteStorage NEXIS 500
- InfiniteStorage NEXIS 2000
- InfiniteStorage NEXIS 7000
- InfiniteStorage NEXIS 7000-HA
- InfiniteStorage NEXIS 9000
- InfiniteStorage Server 3500

=== Displays ===
- 1600SW, a multi-award-winning wide screen video monitor

=== Accelerator cards ===
- IrisVision, one of the first 3D graphics accelerators for high-end PCs

=== Other ===
- Espressigo, Espresso maker in collaboration with Gaggia

== See also ==
- SCO–SGI code dispute of 2003
- Silicon Graphics Image
- Timeline of early 3D computer graphics hardware
