= SGI Virtu =

Visualization systems by Silicon Graphics

- Manufacturer: Silicon Graphics, Inc.
- Type: Workstation
- Released: April 2008
- Discontinued: 2011
- Operating system: Red Hat Enterprise Linux, SUSE Linux Enterprise Server, Windows Compute Cluster Server
- CPU: Xeon, Opteron
- Memory: 4 GB to 128 GB per node
- Graphics: Quadro
- Connectivity: USB
- Predecessor: SGI Prism
- Related: SGI Altix
- Website: http://www.sgi.com/products/visualization/virtu/index.html Archived 2008-04-11 at the Wayback Machine

SGI Virtu is a computer product line from Silicon Graphics dedicated to visualization, announced in April 2008. It represents a return of Silicon Graphics to the visualization market after several years of focus on high-performance computing.

SGI Virtu workstations effectively replaced the SGI Fuel, SGI Tezro and SGI Prism workstations that were discontinued in 2006.

The Virtu range consists of a rack-mounted server configuration (Virtu VN200) and four workstation configurations (Virtu VS series). The latter are re-badged systems from BOXX Technologies, based on Intel Xeon or AMD Opteron processors and Nvidia Quadro graphics chipsets, running Red Hat Enterprise Linux, SUSE Linux Enterprise Server or Windows Compute Cluster Server.

== SGI Virtu VN200 ==
SGI Virtu VN200 is a high density node installed in a rack-mounted enclosure. Five nodes are supported in the 4U enclosure.

The node itself is based on a two-way Intel Xeon 5400 architecture and supports Nvidia Quadro graphics cards and is intended to be clustered.

== SGI Virtu VS ==
The SGI Virtu VS series are the workstation models of the product line. Virtu VS100 is based on a two-way Quad Core Intel Xeon architecture. Virtu VS200 is a two-way AMD Opteron configuration, Virtu VS300 a four-way AMD Opteron and Virtu VS350 is an eight-way AMD Opteron configuration. All systems accept the full range of Nvidia Quadro Plex and Nvidia Quadro graphic solutions. NVIDIA SLI is supported.
