= Sun Visualization System =

Sun Visualization System was a sharable visualization product introduced by Sun Microsystems in January 2007. It used other Sun technologies, including Sun servers, Solaris, Sun Ray Ultra-Thin Clients, and Sun Grid Engine. The Sun Visualization System software was based on several open source technologies: Chromium to perform distributed 3D rendering, VirtualGL to re-route 3D rendering jobs to arbitrary graphics devices, and TurboVNC to deliver the rendered 3D images to a client or clients. Sun sponsored and/or contributed changes back to these projects throughout the life of the Sun Visualization System.

In January 2009, The VirtualGL project reported that it was no longer being sponsored by Sun Microsystems, and in April 2009, Sun announced that it was discontinuing the Sun Shared Visualization and Sun Scalable Visualization products. Customers were able to order the products through July 31, 2009, and service and support was provided until October 2014.

== Main hardware components ==
- Sun Fire servers
- Sun Ultra workstations
- Graphics Accelerators: Sun XVR-2500, Nvidia Quadro FX, or Nvidia Quadro Plex VCS

== Software ==
- The Sun Shared Visualization software consisted of VirtualGL, TurboVNC, a proprietary plugin to allow VirtualGL to send images directly to Sun Ray clients, and glueware to allow remote 3D rendering jobs to be managed by Sun GridEngine.
- The Sun Scalable Visualization software contained customized versions of Chromium, OpenSceneGraph, ParaView, and MPI. It also contained glueware to allow distributed 3D rendering jobs to be managed by Sun GridEngine.
