= Workstation =

High-end single-user computer

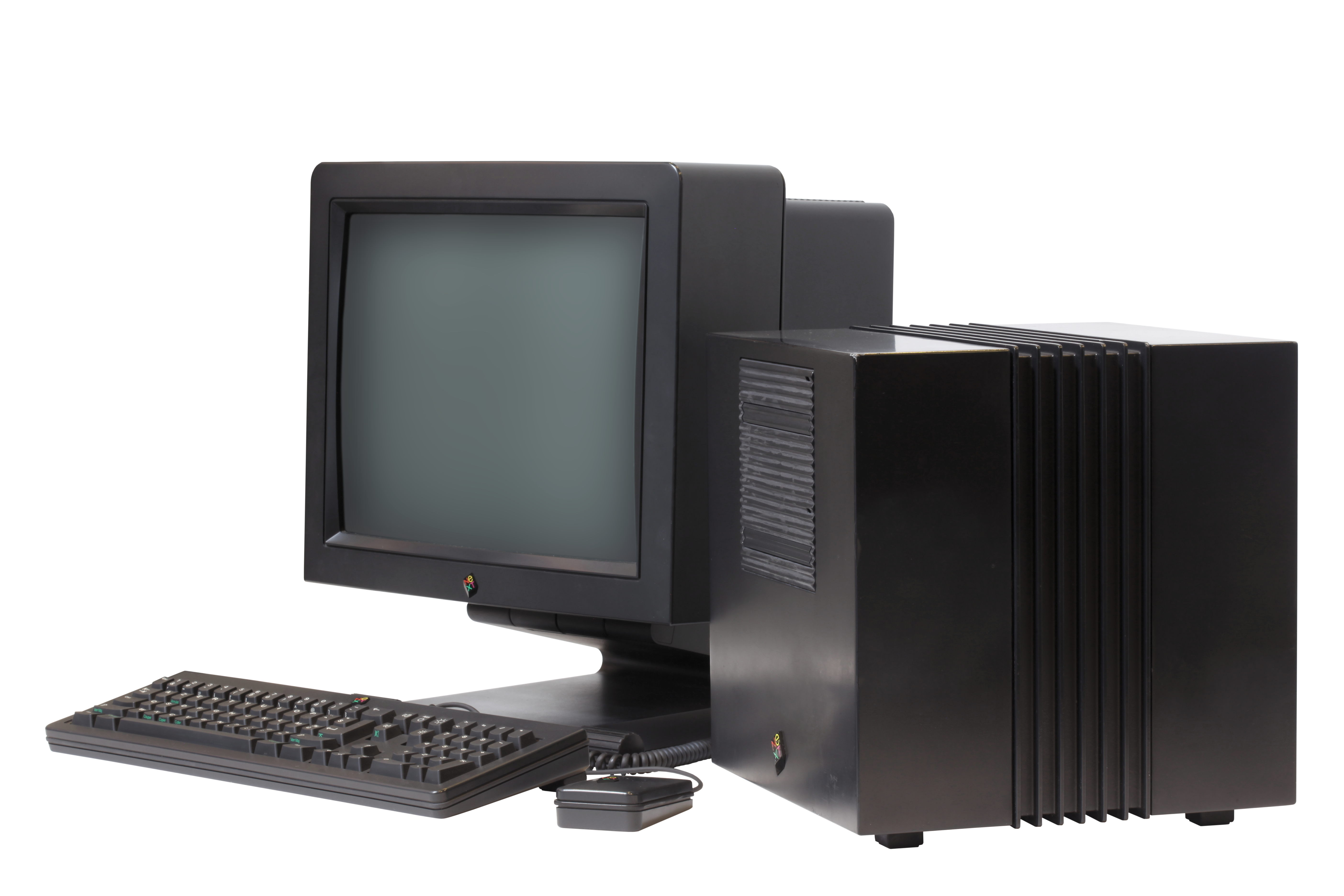
A NeXTcube workstation, the same type on which the World Wide Web was created by Tim Berners-Lee at CERN in Switzerland

A workstation is a special computer designed for technical or scientific applications. Intended primarily to be used by a single user, they are commonly connected to a local area network and run multi-user operating systems. The term workstation has been used loosely to refer to everything from a mainframe computer terminal to a PC connected to a network, but most commonly refers to the class of hardware offered by several current and defunct companies such as Sun Microsystems, Silicon Graphics, Apollo Computer, DEC, HP, NeXT, and IBM beginning in the 1980s.

At the peak of their popularity, workstations offered higher performance specifications than mainstream personal computers, especially in terms of processing, graphics, memory, and multitasking. Workstations are optimized for the visualization and manipulation of different types of complex data such as 3D mechanical design, engineering simulations like computational fluid dynamics, animation, video editing, image editing, medical imaging, image rendering, computational science, generating mathematical plots, and software development. Typically, the form factor is that of a desktop computer, which consists of a high-resolution display, a keyboard, and a mouse at a minimum. The form factor can also offer multiple displays, graphics tablets, and 3D mice for manipulating objects and navigating scenes. Workstations were the first segment of the computer market to present advanced accessories, and collaboration tools like videoconferencing.

The increasing capabilities of mainstream PCs since the late 1990s have reduced the distinction between PCs and workstations. Typical 1980s and 1990s workstations had expensive proprietary hardware and operating systems to categorically distinguish from standardized PCs; most had RISC-based processors and ran UNIX-based operating systems, but by the early 2000s, workstation offerings shifted to highly commoditized hardware dominated by large PC vendors, such as Dell, HP Inc., and Fujitsu, selling x86-64 systems running Windows or Linux.

== History ==
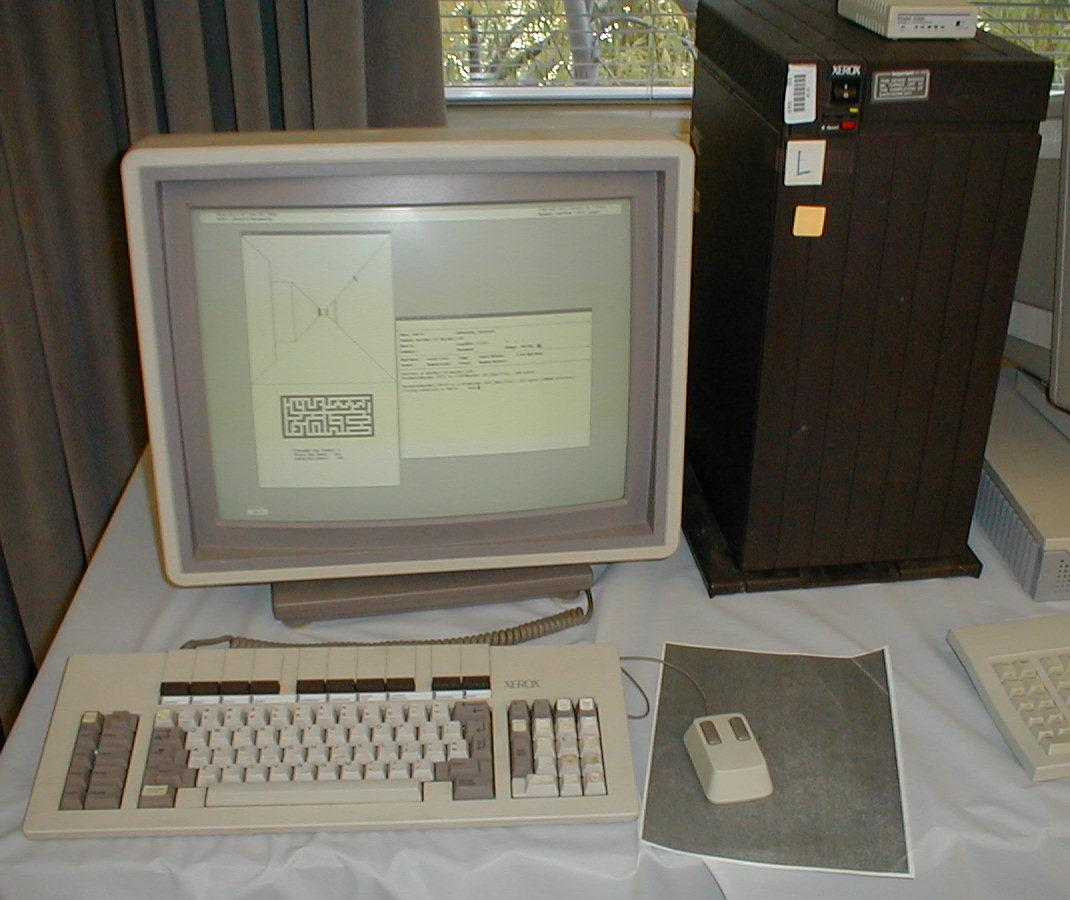
Early Xerox workstation

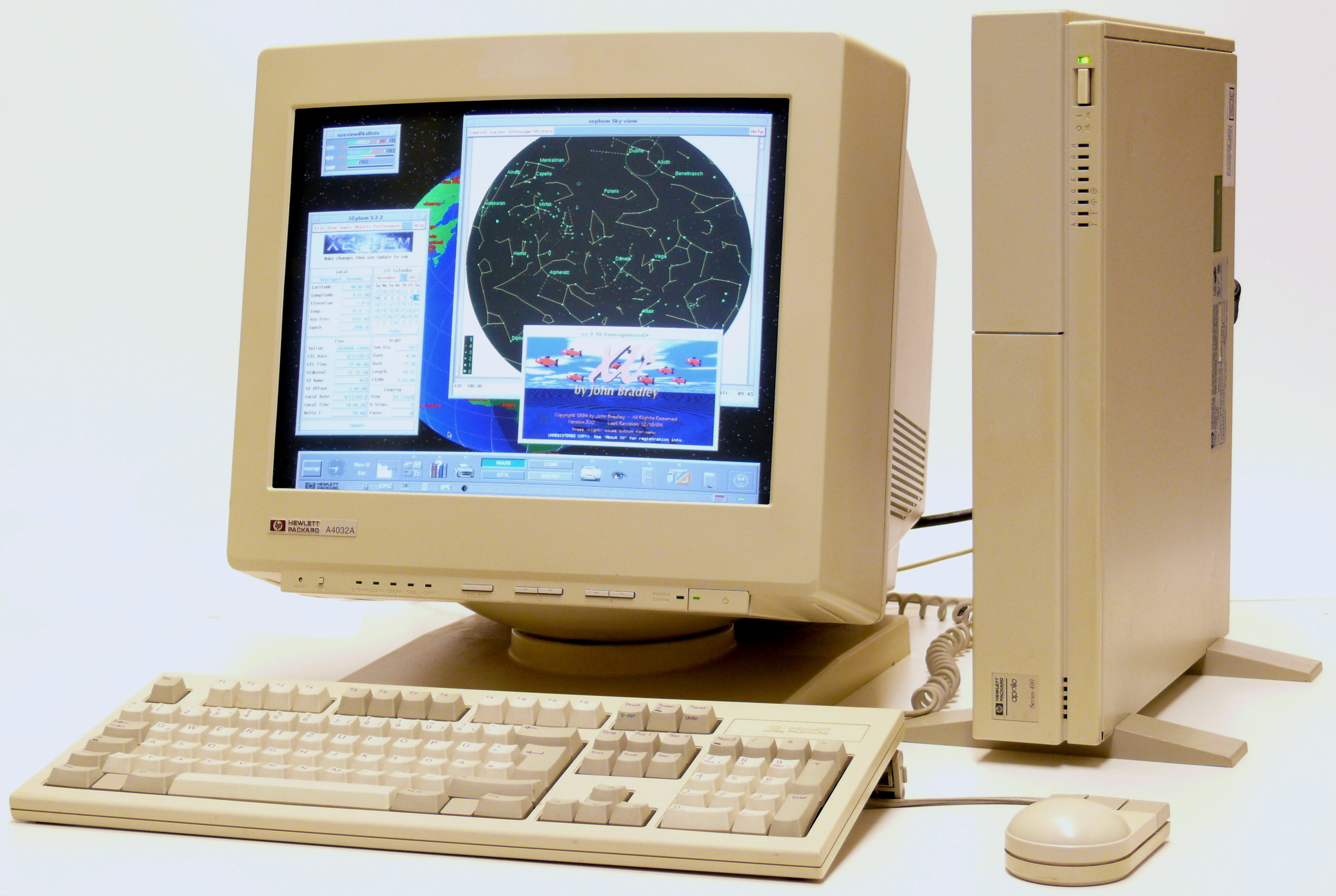
HP 9000 model 425 workstation running HP-UX 9 and Visual User Environment (VUE)

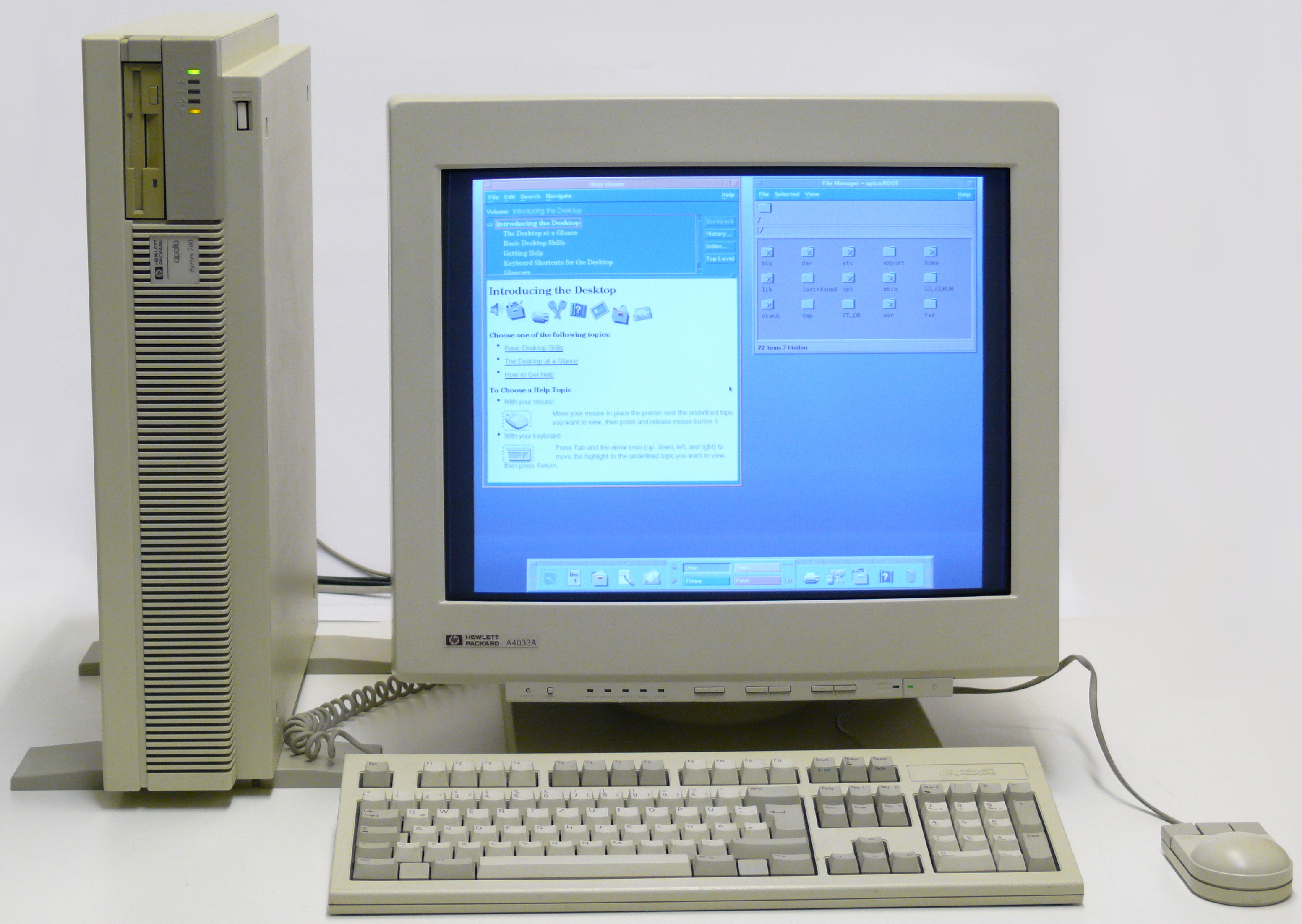
HP 9000 model 735 running HP-UX and the Common Desktop Environment (CDE)

=== Origins and development ===
Workstations predate the first personal computer (PC). The first computer that might qualify as a workstation was the IBM 1620, codenamed "CADET", a small scientific computer designed to be used interactively by a single person sitting at the console. It was introduced in 1959. One feature of this machine was that it lacked any arithmetic circuitry. To perform addition, it required a memory-resident table of decimal addition rules. This reduced the cost of logic circuitry, enabling IBM to make it inexpensive. It was initially rented for $1000 per month.

In 1965, the 1620 was succeeded by the IBM 1130 scientific computer. Built into roughly desk-sized cabinets with console typewriters, they could be configured with optional add-on disk drives, printers, and both paper-tape and punch-card I/O.

Early workstations were generally dedicated minicomputers, a multiuser system repurposed for a single user. For example, the PDP-8 from Digital Equipment Corporation (DEC), is regarded as the first commercial minicomputer.

Workstations have historically been more advanced than contemporary PCs, with more powerful CPU architectures, more advanced graphics, more memory, and multitasking with sophisticated operating systems like Unix. They typically offered networking as a standard capability, long before this became prevalent in personal computing. Because of their minicomputer heritage, workstations since their introduction have supported professional and expensive software such as CAD and graphics design, as opposed to PCs' games and text editors. The Lisp machines developed at MIT in the early 1970s pioneered some workstation principles, as high-performance, networked, single-user systems intended for heavily interactive use. Lisp machines were commercialized beginning in 1980 by companies such as Symbolics, Lisp Machines, Texas Instruments (the TI Explorer), and Xerox (the Interlisp-D workstations). The first computer designed for a single user, with high-resolution graphics (and so a workstation in the modern sense), was the Alto developed at Xerox PARC in 1973. Other early workstations include the Terak 8510/a (1977), Three Rivers PERQ (1979), and the later Xerox Star (1981).

=== 1980s: rise in popularity ===
In the early 1980s, with the advent of 32-bit microprocessors such as the Motorola 68000, several new competitors appeared, including Apollo Computer and Sun Microsystems, with workstations based on the 68000 and Unix. DARPA's VLSI Project created several graphic workstations, such as the Silicon Graphics 3130. Workstation vendors began to adopt RISC CPUs in the mid to late 1980s. Competition among RISC vendors lowered CPU prices to as little as $10 per MIPS, much less expensive than the Intel 80386; after large price cuts in 1987 and 1988, a personal workstation suitable for 2D CAD costing $5,000 to $25,000 was available from multiple vendors. Mid-range models capable of 3D graphics cost from $35,000 to $60,000, and high-end models overlapping with minicomputers cost from $80,000 to $100,000.

InfoWorld in 1989 described Sun as "the unquestioned leader in the workstation arena". It and other RISC workstation vendors like Hewlett-Packard (HP) were very successful in luring customers from traditional minicomputer companies like DEC and Data General with more performance per dollar, forcing them to release their own workstations that year. Apollo said that systems costing less than $15,000 (equivalent to $39,000 in 2025) were half of all workstation sales. At that time, a $12,000 (equivalent to $31,000 in 2025) "personal workstation" might be a high-end device like the Macintosh II or IBM PS/2 Model 80, or a low-end or hybrid device like the NeXT Computer, all with similar, overlapping specifications. Workstation prices were declining by 20% annually; the Apollo DN2500 cost as little as $3,990 (equivalent to $10,000 in 2025), which an industry analyst said was the "magic price point" where customers would consider workstations over PCs. BYTE predicted "Soon, the only way we'll be able to tell the difference between traditional workstations and PCs will be by the operating system they run", with the former running Unix and the latter running OS/2, classic Mac OS, and/or Unix. Many workstations by then had some method to run increasingly popular and powerful PC software such as Lotus 1-2-3 or Microsoft Word. Another differentiator between PC and workstation was that the latter was much more likely to have a graphics accelerator with support for a graphics standard like PHIGS or X Window, while the former usually depended on software rendering or proprietary accelerators. The computer animation industry's needs typically caused improvements in graphical technology, with CAD using the same improvements later. BYTE demonstrated that year that an individual could build a workstation with commodity components with specifications comparable to commercially available low-end workstations.

By 1990, when IBM announced the RS/6000, workstations were the fastest-growing segment of the PC market. Competition decreased prices so quickly that Gartner Group that year advised depreciation for Unix RISC systems of 45% or more annually, twice the normal rate. Workstations often featured SCSI or Fibre Channel disk storage systems, high-end 3D accelerators, single or multiple 64-bit processors, large amounts of RAM, and well-designed cooling. Additionally, the companies that make the products tend to have comprehensive repair/replacement plans. As the distinction between workstation and PC fades, however, workstation manufacturers have increasingly employed "off-the-shelf" PC components and graphics solutions rather than proprietary hardware or software. Some "low-cost" workstations are still expensive by PC standards but offer binary compatibility with higher-end workstations and servers made by the same vendor. This allows software development to take place on low-cost (relative to the server) desktop machines.

=== Thin clients ===
Workstations diversified to the lowest possible price point as opposed to performance, called the thin client or network computer. Dependent upon a network and server, this reduces the machine to having no hard drive, and only the CPU, keyboard, mouse, and screen. Some diskless nodes still run a traditional operating system and perform computations locally, with storage on a remote server. These are intended to reduce the initial system purchase cost, and the total cost of ownership, by reducing the amount of administration required per user.

This approach was first attempted as a replacement for PCs in office productivity applications, with the 3Station by 3Com. In the 1990s, X terminals filled a similar role for technical computing. Sun's thin clients included the Sun Ray product line. However, purchasing and managing traditional workstations and PCs continued to drop in price and complexity as remote management tools for IT staff became available, undercutting this market.

=== 3M computer ===
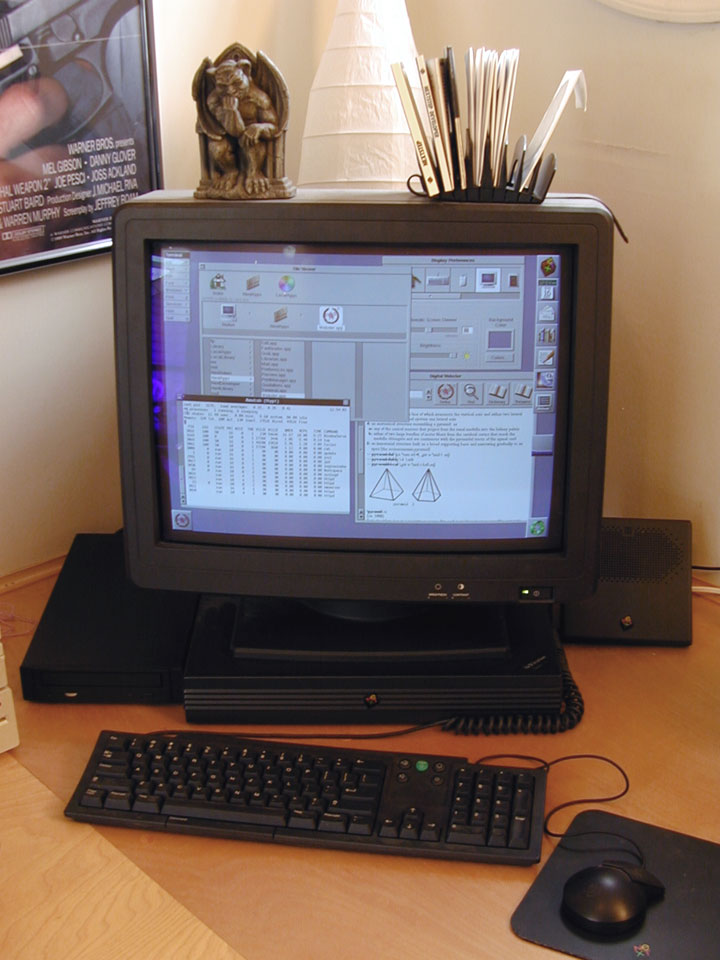
A NeXTstation graphics workstation from 1990

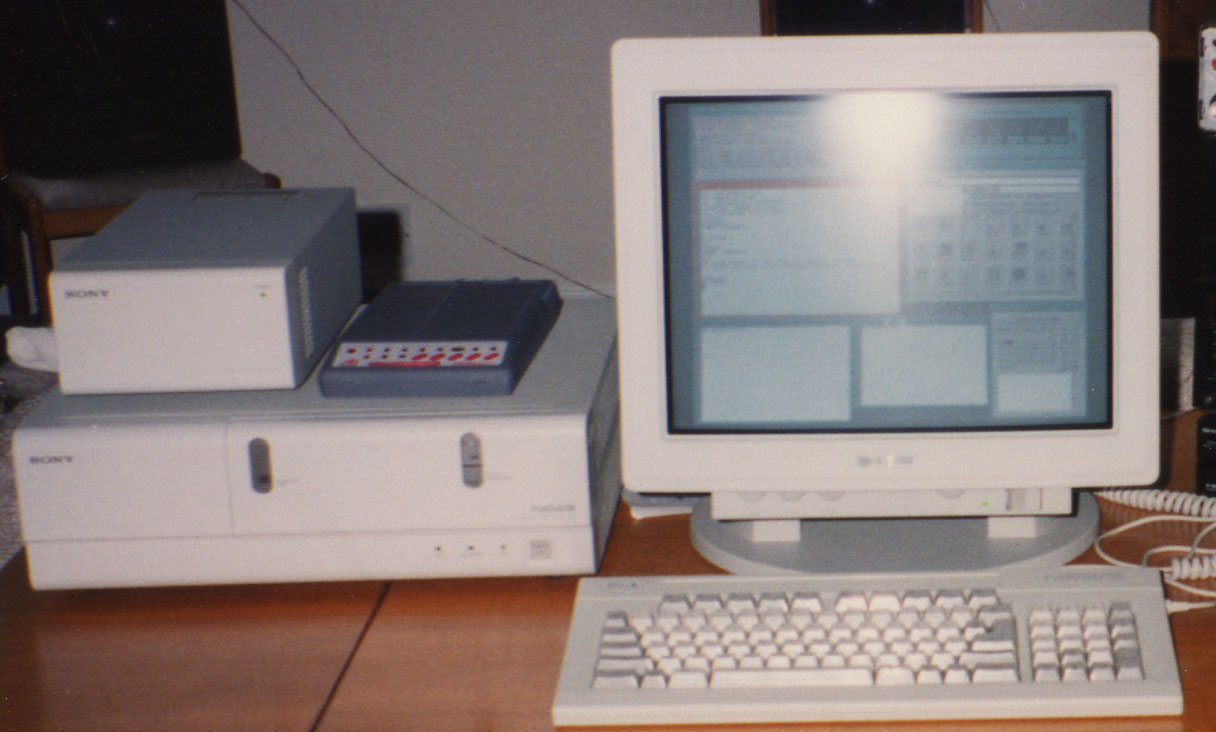
Sony NEWS workstation: 2× 68030 at 25 MHz, 1280×1024 pixel and 256-color display

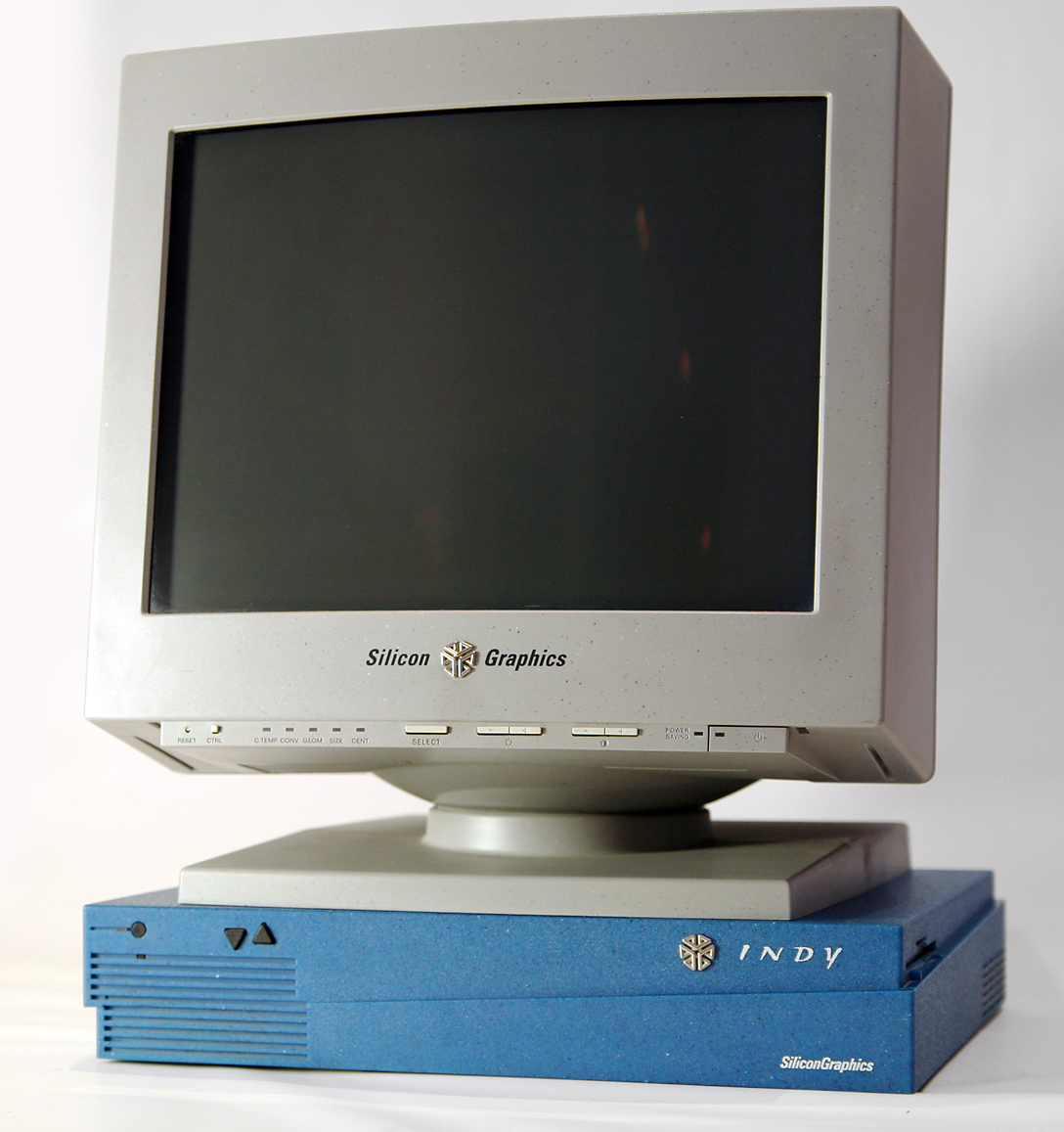
SGI Indy graphics workstation

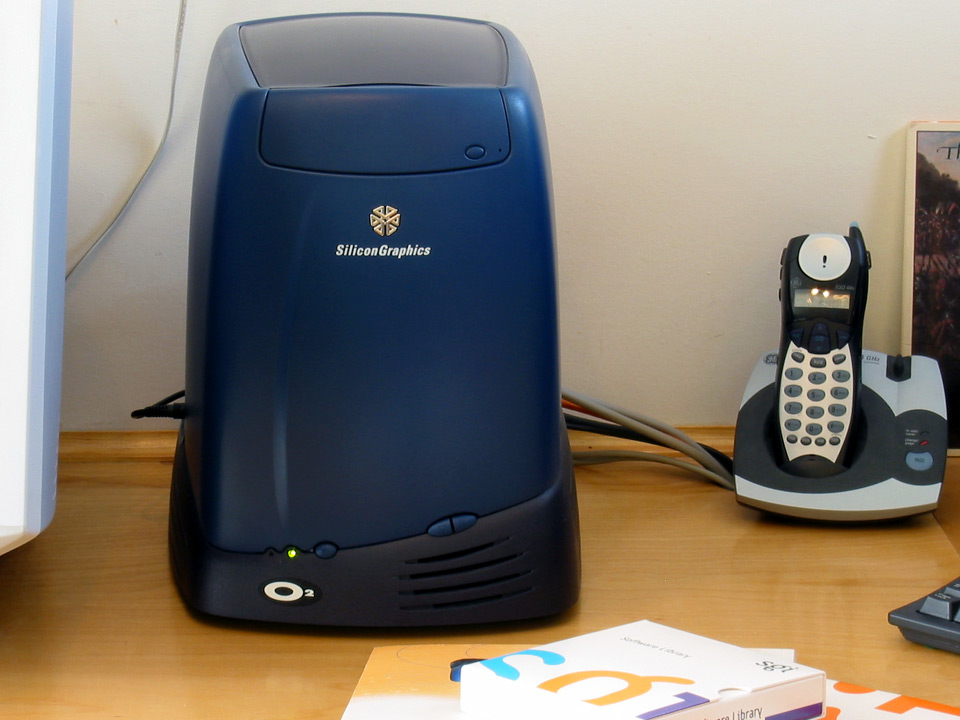
SGI O2 graphics workstation

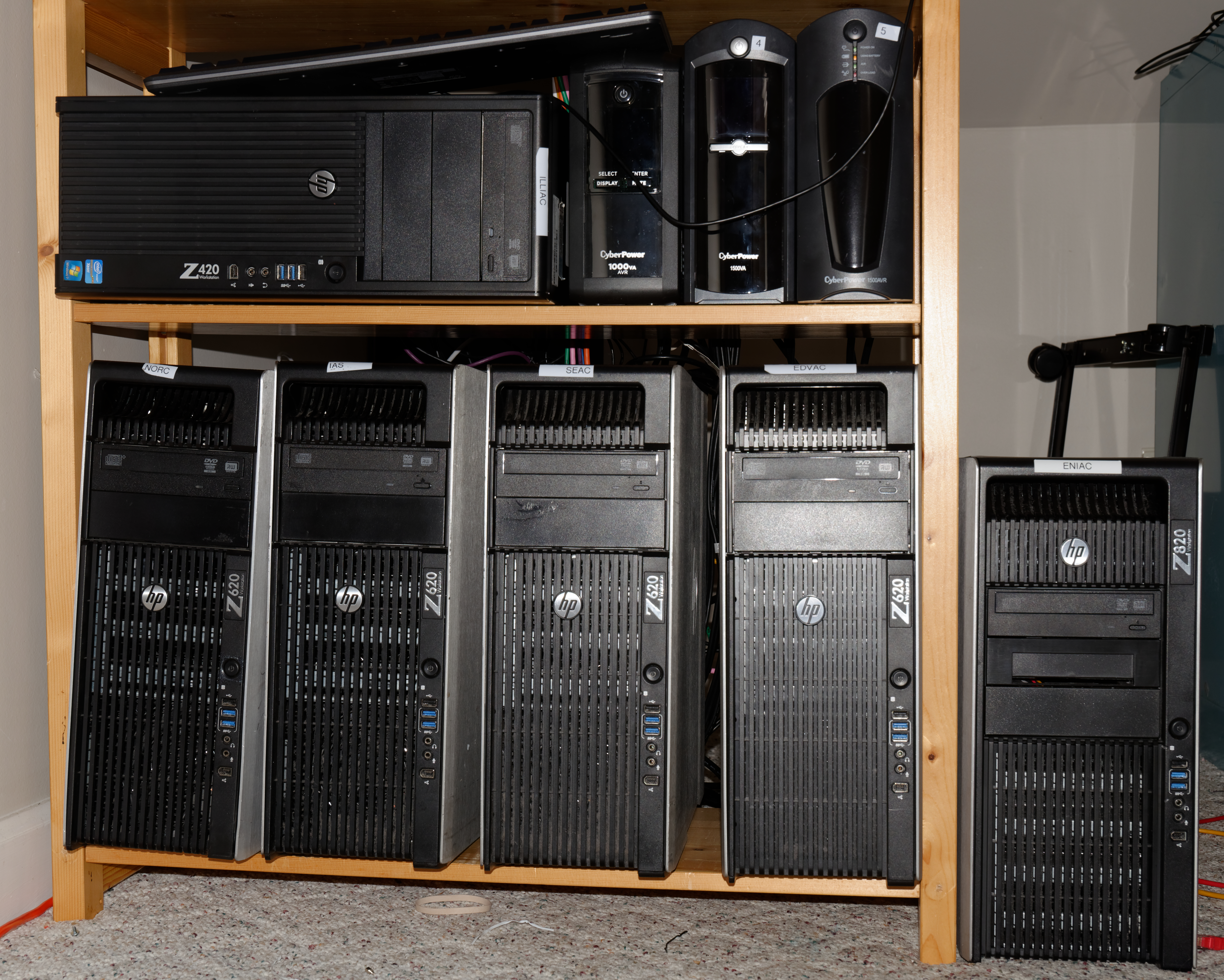
Six workstations: four HP Z620, one HP Z820, one HP Z420

In the early 1980s, the target for high-end workstations was the "3M computer", as defined by Raj Reddy: a megabyte of memory, a megapixel display (roughly 1000×1000 pixels), and one mega-instruction per second processor (at least one million floating-point operations per second). This was at least one order of magnitude beyond the capacity of the personal computer of the time. The original 1981 IBM Personal Computer had 16 KB memory, a text-only display, and floating-point performance around 1 kFLOPS (30 kFLOPS with the optional 8087 math coprocessor).

Another goal was to bring the price below "1 megapenny" (10,000 dollars), which was achieved in the late 1980s to early 1990s. Throughout the early to mid-1990s, many high end workstations cost from $15,000 to $100,000.

Other features beyond the typical personal computer of the time included networking, graphics acceleration, and high-speed internal and peripheral data buses.

=== Decline ===
The increasing adoption of key technologies into mainstream PCs was a direct factor in the decline of the workstation as a separate market segment:

- Reliable components
- High-performance 3D graphics hardware for computer-aided design (CAD) and computer-generated imagery (CGI) animation became increasingly popular in the PC market around the mid-to-late 1990s, mostly driven by computer gaming, yielding the first official GPU in Nvidia's NV10 and the breakthrough GeForce 256.
- High-performance CPUs: the first RISC CPUs of the early 1980s offered roughly one order of magnitude in performance improvement over CISC processors of comparable cost. Intel's x86 CISC family always had the edge in market share and the economies of scale that this implied. By the mid-1990s, some CISC processors like the Motorola 68040 and Intel's 80486 and Pentium have performance parity with RISC in some areas, such as integer performance (at the cost of greater chip complexity) and hardware floating-point calculations, relegating RISC to even more high-end markets.
- Hardware support for floating-point operations: optional on the original IBM PC; remained on a separate chip for Intel systems until the 80486DX processor. Even then, x86 floating-point performance lagged other processors due to limitations in its architecture. Even low-price PCs have long offered performance in the gigaFLOPS range.
- High-performance/high-capacity data storage: early workstations tend to use proprietary disk interfaces until the SCSI standard of the mid-1980s. Although SCSI interfaces soon became available for IBM PCs, they were comparatively expensive and tend to be limited by the speed of the PC's ISA peripheral bus. SCSI is an advanced controller interface good for multitasking and daisy chaining. This makes it suited for use in servers, and its benefits to desktop PCs which mostly run single-user operating systems are less clear, but it was standard on the 1980s-1990s Macintosh. Serial ATA is more modern, with throughput comparable to SCSI but at a lower cost.
- High-speed networking (10 Mbit/s or better): 10 Mbit/s network interfaces were commonly available for PCs by the early 1990s, although by that time workstations were pursuing even higher networking speeds, moving to 100 Mbit/s, 1 Gbit/s, and 10 Gbit/s. However, economies of scale and the demand for high-speed networking in even non-technical areas have dramatically decreased the time it takes for newer networking technologies to reach commodity price points.
- Large displays (17- to 21-inch) with high resolutions and high refresh rates for graphics and CAD work, which were rare among PCs in the late 1980s and early 1990s but became common among PCs by the late 1990s.
- Large memory configurations: PCs (such as IBM clones) were originally limited to 640 KB of RAM until the 1982 introduction of the 80286 processor; early workstations had megabytes of memory. IBM clones require special programming techniques to address more than 640 KB until the 80386, as opposed to other 32-bit processors such as SPARC which provide straightforward access to nearly their entire 4 GB memory address range. 64-bit workstations and servers supporting an address range far beyond 4 GB have been available since the early 1990s, a technology just beginning to appear in the PC desktop and server market in the mid-2000s.
- Operating system: early workstations ran the Unix operating system (OS), a Unix-like variant, or other feature-rich OSes such as VMS. The PC CPUs of the time had limitations in memory capacity and memory access protection, making them unsuitable to run OSes of this sophistication, but this, too, began to change in the late 1980s as PCs with the 32-bit 80386, with integrated paged MMUs, became widely affordable and enabling OS/2, Windows NT 3.1, and Unix-like systems based on BSD and Linux on commodity PC hardware.
- Tight integration between the OS and the hardware: Workstation vendors both design the hardware and maintain the Unix operating system variant that runs on it. This allows for much more rigorous testing than is possible with an operating system such as Windows. Windows requires that third-party hardware vendors write compliant hardware drivers that are stable and reliable. Also, minor variations in hardware quality such as timing or build quality can affect the reliability of the overall machine. Workstation vendors are able to ensure both the quality of the hardware, and the stability of the operating system drivers by validating these things in-house, and this leads to a generally much more reliable and stable machine.

=== Market position ===
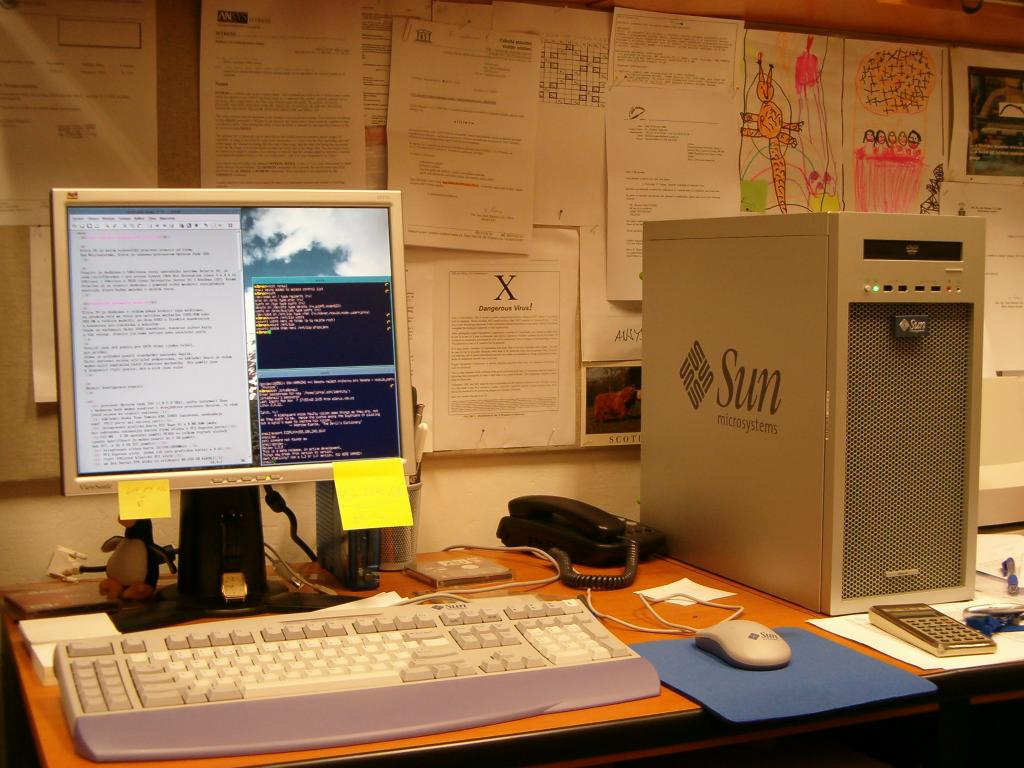
Sun Ultra 20 with AMD's Opteron processor and Solaris 10

Since the late 1990s, the workstation and consumer markets have further merged. Many low-end workstation components are now the same as the consumer market, and the price differential narrowed. For example, most Macintosh Quadra computers were originally intended for scientific or design work, all with the Motorola 68040 CPU, backward compatible with 68000 Macintoshes. The consumer Macintosh IIcx and Macintosh IIci models can be upgraded to the Quadra 700. "In an era when many professionals preferred Silicon Graphics workstations, the Quadra 700 was an intriguing option at a fraction of the cost" as resource-intensive software such as Infini-D brought "studio-quality 3D rendering and animations to the home desktop". The Quadra 700 can run A/UX 3.0, making it a Unix workstation. Another example is the Nvidia GeForce 256 consumer graphics card, which spawned the Quadro workstation card, which has the same GPU but different driver support and certifications for CAD applications and a much higher price.

Workstations have typically driven advancements in CPU technology. All computers benefit from multi-processor and multicore designs (basically multiple processors on a die). The multicore design was pioneered by IBM's POWER4; it and Intel Xeon have multiple CPUs, more on-die cache, and ECC memory.

Some workstations are designed or certified for use with only one specific application such as AutoCAD, Avid Xpress Studio HD, or 3D Studio Max. The certification process increases workstation prices.

== Modern workstations ==
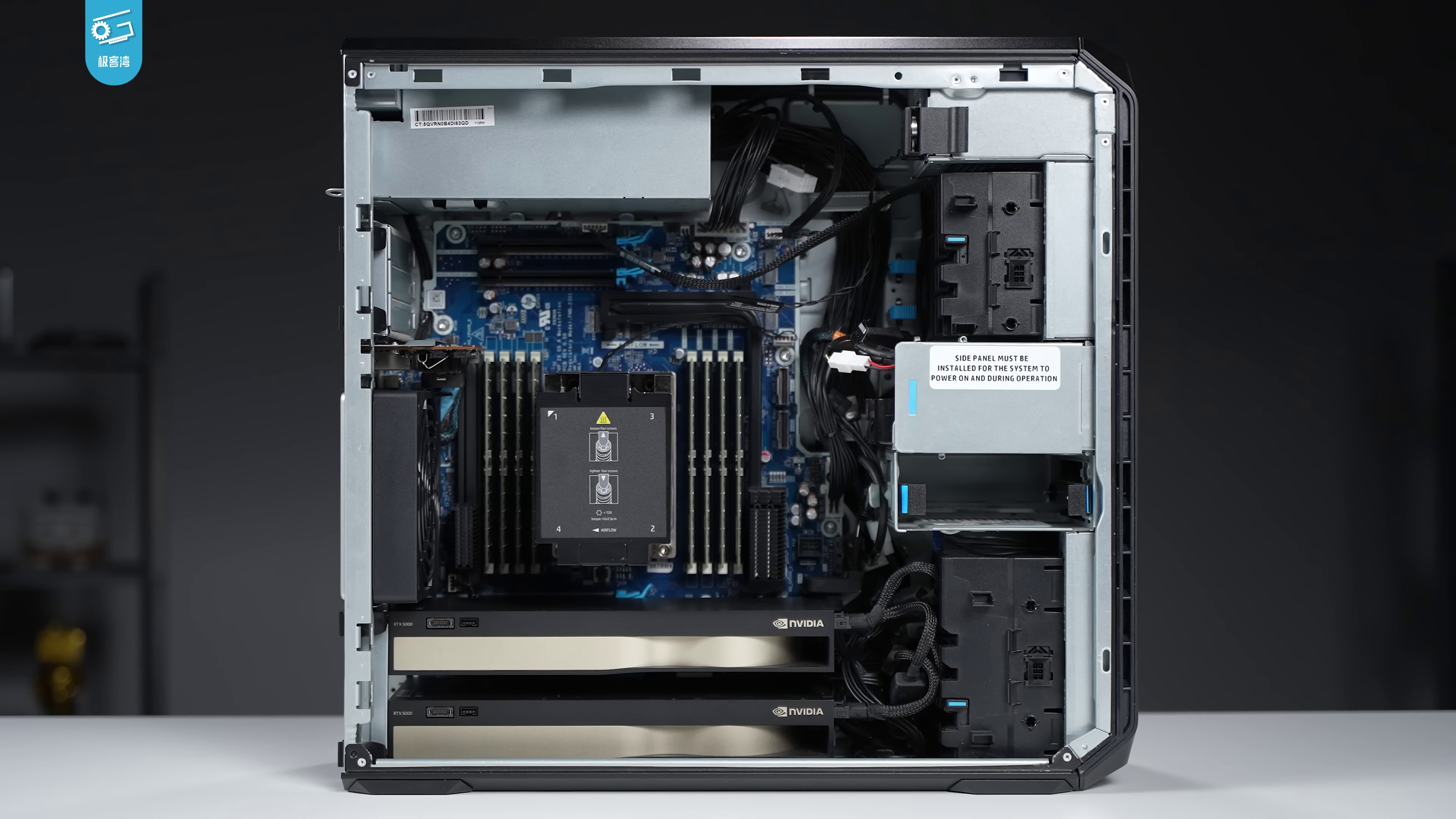
This Hewlett-Packard Z6, an x86-64-based workstation, has two RTX 5000 GPUs.

=== GPU workstations ===
Modern workstations are typically desktop computers with AMD or NVIDIA GPUs to do high-performance computing on software programs such as video editing, 3D modeling, computer-aided design, and rendering.

In October 2024, System 76 introduced the Thelio Astra, an ARM workstation tailored for car software development.

=== Decline of RISC workstations ===
By January 2009, all RISC-based workstation product lines had been discontinued:

- In 2008 Hewlett-Packard retired its last HP 9000 PA-RISC-based desktop products from the market.
- IBM retired the IntelliStation POWER on January 2, 2009.
- SGI ended general availability of its MIPS-based SGI Fuel and SGI Tezro workstations in December 2006.
- Sun Microsystems announced end-of-life for its last Sun Ultra SPARC workstations in October 2008.

=== x86-64 ===
Most of the current workstation market uses x86-64 microprocessors. Operating systems include Windows, FreeBSD, Linux distributions, macOS, and Solaris. Some vendors also market commodity mono-socket systems as workstations.

These are three types of workstations:

1. Workstation blade systems (IBM HC10 or Hewlett-Packard xw460c. Sun Visualization System was akin to these solutions)
2. Ultra high-end workstation (SGI Virtu VS3xx)
3. Deskside systems containing server-class CPUs and chipsets on large server-class motherboards with high-end RAM (HP Z-series workstations and Fujitsu CELSIUS workstations)

=== High-end workstations ===
A high-end desktop market segment includes workstations, with PC operating systems and components. Component product lines may be segmented, with premium components that are functionally similar to the consumer models but with higher robustness or performance.

A workstation-class PC may have some of the following features:

- Larger number of memory sockets which use DIMM slots or registered (buffered) modules
- Multiple displays
- Reliable high-performance graphics card
- Multiple processor sockets, powerful CPUs
- Run reliable operating system with advanced features
- Support for ECC memory
- M.2 or PCI-E NVMe SSD

== See also ==
- Mobile workstation
- Desktop form factor
- Gaming computer
- List of computer system manufacturers
- Music workstation
- Personal supercomputer
- Remote Graphics Software
