= Terak 8510/a =

1977 graphical desktop computer

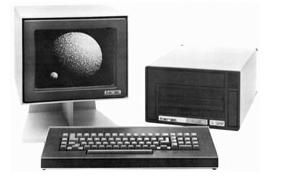
- Terak 8510/a workstation with keyboard and graphic display
- Manufacturer: Terak Corporation
- Type: Workstation
- Released: 1977; 49 years ago
- Introductory price: Starting at US$8,935 (equivalent to $31,642 in 2025)
- Operating system: UCSD p-System; RT-11
- CPU: LSI-11 Compatible Processor

The Terak 8510/a was a graphical desktop workstation developed by the Terak Corporation in 1977. It was among the first desktop personal computers with a bitmap graphics display. It was a desktop workstation with an LSI-11 compatible processor, a graphical framebuffer, and a text mode with downloadable fonts. The combined weight of processor, display, and keyboard was approximately 50 lb (23 kg). Despite the lack of an MMU, it was capable of running a stripped version of UNIX version 6. It was the first personal machine on which the UCSD p-System was widely used. Various universities in the USA used it in the late 1970s through mid-1980s to teach Pascal programming. It provided immediate graphic feedback from simple programs encouraging students to learn.

Three entrepreneurs started the Terak Corporation in 1975: Brian Benzar, William Mayberry and Dennis Kodimer. Terak products were manufactured in Scottsdale, Arizona from 1976 thru 1984. Sales reached $10M and Terak was publicly traded in 1983-84. Besides the original frame-buffer-centric 8510/a, other products were developed: color graphics and a Unix workstation. A Terak computer was on display at the Boston Museum of Science and also the Jefferson Computer Museum.
