= SGI Origin 350 =

The SGI Origin 350 is a mid-range server computer developed and manufactured by SGI introduced in 2003. Their discontinuation in December 2006 brought to a close almost two decades of MIPS and IRIX computing.

== Hardware ==
The Origin 350 is based on the NUMAflex architecture, where a system is constructed from a varying number of modules connected together using the NUMAlink3 interconnect via cables. A system can consist of 2 to 32 processors, 1 to 64 GB of memory and 4 to 62 PCI-X slots. For systems with more than 8 processors, a 2U NUMAlink module is required for routing. Modules for disk storage and further PCI slots were also available. Multiple modules are coordinated at power up by an L2 controller which communicated to the modules via USB ports. The L2 controller was an external PowerPC computer running Linux with console, USB, modem and Ethernet ports.

=== Compute module ===
The 2U compute module contained the processors, memory and four PCI-X slots on two buses. Each compute module features an IP53 node board, which contains two or four MIPS R16000 microprocessors clocked at 600 or 700 MHz with 4 MB of ECC L2 cache, eight DIMM slots for 1 to 8 GB of ECC memory, a Bedrock ASIC serving as the crossbar for enabling communication between the processors, memory and PCI-X slots.

Two variants of the compute module exist, the base compute module and the system expansion compute modules. The difference between these two models is that the inclusion of a SCSI disk drive and an IO9 input/output card is mandatory in the base compute module, but optional in the system expansion compute module. The IO9 input/output card connects to a PCI-X slot and provides SCSI interfaces for two internal disks, an external SCSI port, audio I/O and a 10/100/1000BASE-T Ethernet connection.
