= Research Computing Services =

English-based research program

Research Computing Services (separated in August 2007 from the former Manchester Computing at the University of Manchester), provides the focus for the University of Manchester's activities in supercomputing or high-performance computing, grid computing or e-science and computational science. Research Computing Services activities include services, training and research & development.

== Supercomputers ==
The University of Manchester has been home to many supercomputers, starting from the 1948 Manchester Baby - the world's first stored program computer. Others have included CDC7600 (1972, and a second in 1977), a CDC Cyber 205, VP1200, VPX and 240/10. The CSAR service (see below) supercomputers included a 576 PE Cray T3E-1200E (1998, upgraded to 816PE in 2000), and SGI Origin 3000 (2001) and Altix (2003) systems. More recently some large clusters (e.g., the 200 processor Dell EM64T cluster) have been installed.

== National Computing Services ==
Research Computing Services and its predecessors (Manchester Computing etc.) have been providing (high performance) computing services nationally in the UK since the 1970s. Manchester Computing operated the UK's 1998-2006 national supercomputer service CSAR with SGI and CSC Ltd. It currently operates other national computer services in the UK, including the Access Grid Support Centre (AGSC) and, as part of consortia, the UK National Grid Service (NGS) and North West Grid.

== Research Centres ==
Research Computing Services is a part of several research centres including E-Science North West (ESNW), and the UK's National Centre for e-Social Science (NCeSS).
