= ASCI Blue Mountain =

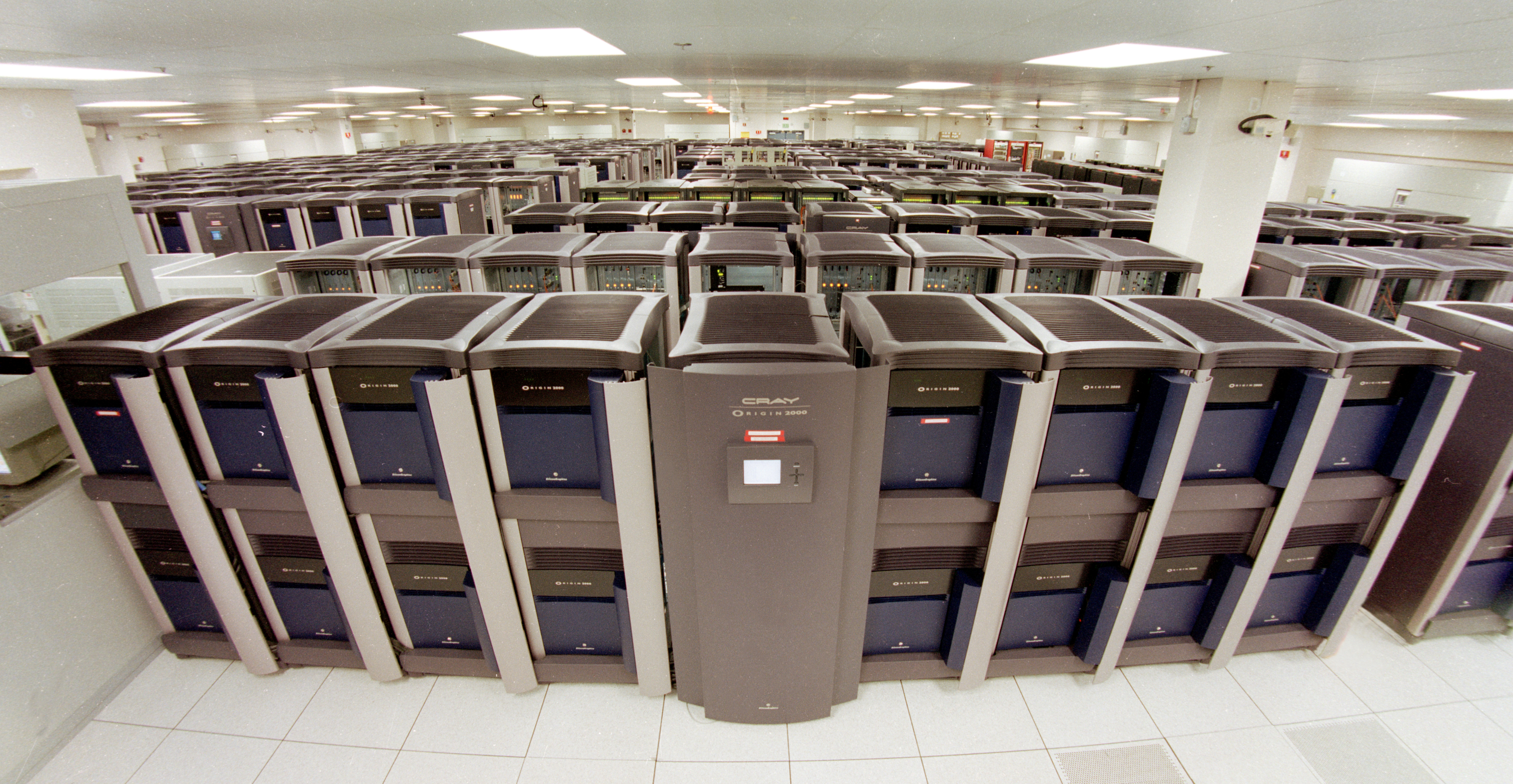
Blue Mountain supercomputer facility at the Los Alamos National Laboratory in 2001.

ASCI Blue Mountain was a supercomputer installed at the Los Alamos National Laboratory in Los Alamos, New Mexico. It was designed to run simulations for the United States National Nuclear Security Administration's Advanced Simulation and Computing program. The computer was a collaboration between Silicon Graphics Corporation and Los Alamos National Laboratory. It was installed in 1998.

It was a cluster of ccNUMA SGI Origin 2000 systems. It contains 6,144 MIPS R10000 microprocessors in 48 systems, each with 128 CPUs, connected by HIPPI in 438 racks. Its theoretical top performance is 3.072 teraflops.

It was built as a stage of the Accelerated Strategic Computing Initiative (ASCI) started by the U.S. Department of Energy and the National Nuclear Security Administration to build a simulator to replace live nuclear weapons testing following the moratorium on testing started by President George H. W. Bush in 1992 and extended by Bill Clinton in 1993. It was unveiled (commissioned) in 1998. In June 1999 it was the world's second fastest computer, and remained among the world's ten fastest computers until November 2001. According to the Los Alamos National Laboratory website, the supercomputer set a world record in May 2000, with the equivalent of 17.8 years of normal computer processing within 72 hours, including 15,000 engineering simulations requiring 10 hours each.

First commissioned in November 1998, the Blue Mountain was decommissioned on Monday, November 8, 2004 at 8 am, and was replaced by the ASCI Q, Lightning, and QSC supercomputers.
