= TGL =

TGL may refer to:

== Aviation ==
- Touch-and-go landing, a flight teaching maneuver.

== Computing ==
- Technical Group Laboratory, a Japanese game company
- Tiger Lake series Intel CPUs
- Transparent OpenGL, part of OpenGL Multipipe

== Sports ==
- TGL (golf league), a golf league formed in partnership with the PGA Tour that began play in 2025

== Other uses ==
- The ISO 639 language code for Tagalog language
