= SGI Onyx2 =

Computer series

Onyx2
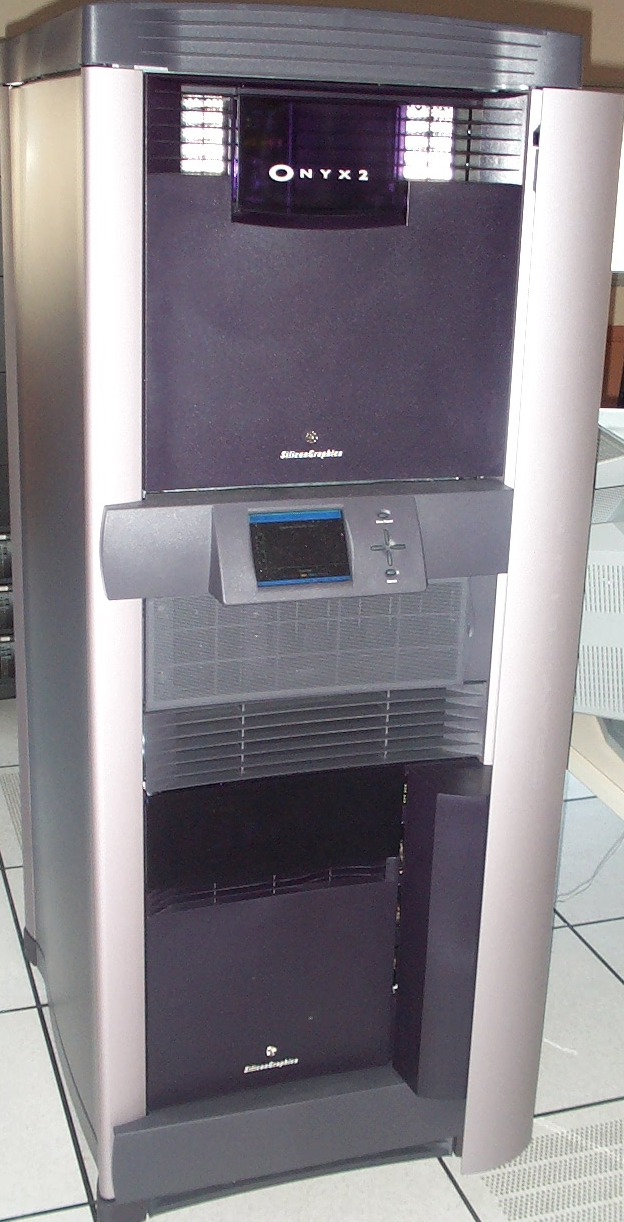
- Single-rack Onyx2
- Manufacturer: Silicon Graphics, Inc.
- Released: 1996; 30 years ago
- Discontinued: June 27, 2003
- Operating system: IRIX 6.4 or 6.5
- CPU: MIPS architecture
- Graphics: Reality and InfiniteReality
- Predecessor: Onyx
- Successor: Onyx 3000
- Website: sgi.com

Onyx2, codenamed Kego, is a family of visualization systems. It was developed and manufactured by SGI, and introduced in 1996 to succeed the Onyx. Onyx2 architecture is based on Origin 2000 server plus graphics hardware. In 2000, the Onyx2 was succeeded by the Onyx 3000, and it was discontinued on June 27, 2003. These systems run either IRIX 6.4 or 6.5.

== Hardware ==
Model	CPUs	Memory	Graphics pipelines	Chassis	Introduced	Discontinued
Onyx2 Deskside	1 to 4	128 MB to 8 GB	1	Deskside	?	June 27, 2003
Onyx2 Single Rack	2 to 8	128 MB to 16 GB	1 or 2	Single rack	?	June 27, 2003
Onyx2 Multi-Rack	4 to 128	256 MB to 256 GB	1 to 16	Multi Rack	?	June 27, 2003

Onyx2 uses the MIPS R10000 microprocessor clocked at 150, 175, 180, and 195 MHz, later increased to 250 MHz, due to a process shrink from 0.35 to 0.25 micrometers. Later 300 and 400 MHz R12000, and 500 MHz R14000 CPUs were released.

At the time of their introduction, the Onyx2 could be configured with the Reality, InfiniteReality, or InfiniteReality2 graphics subsystems. Later, the InfiniteReality2E was released and then the InfiniteReality3, in April 2000.

Preceded by Origin 200	Origin 2000; 1996 - 2003	Succeeded by Origin 3000
Preceded by Onyx	Onyx 2; 1996 - 2003	Succeeded by Onyx 3000
