= ASC Purple =

ASC Purple was a supercomputer installed at the Lawrence Livermore National Laboratory in Livermore, California. The computer was a collaboration between IBM Corporation and Lawrence Livermore Lab. Announced November 19, 2002, it was installed in July 2005 and decommissioned on November 10, 2010. The contract for this computer along with the Blue Gene/L supercomputer was worth US $290 million. As of November 2009, the computer ranked 66th on the TOP500 supercomputer list.

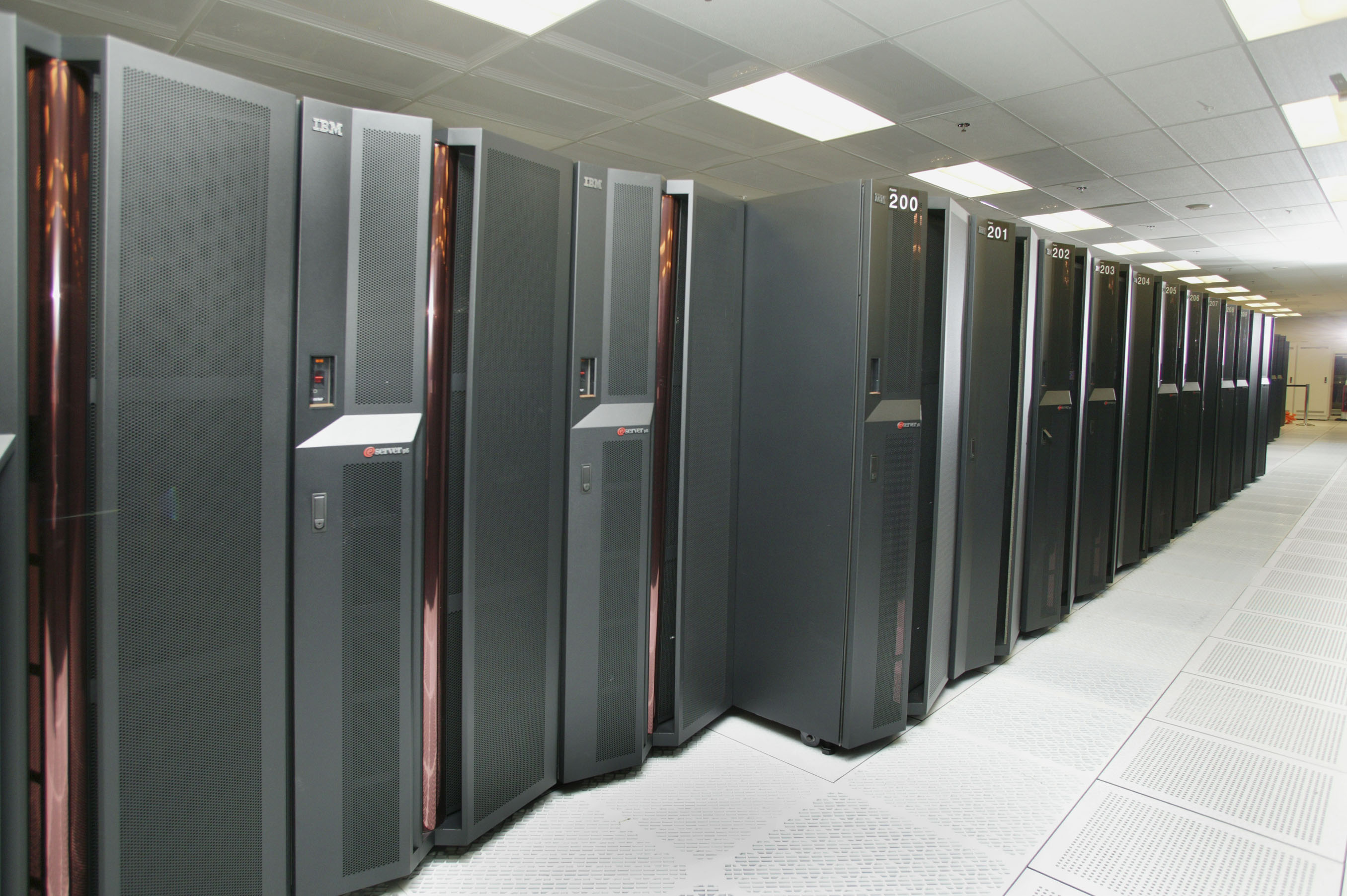
ASC Purple computing nodes

It was a redundant ring of POWER5 SMP servers. 196 of these machines were connected together. The system contained 12,544 POWER5 microprocessors in total with 50 terabytes of total memory and 2 petabytes of total disk storage. The system ran IBM's AIX 5L operating system. The computer consumed 7.5 MW of electricity, including cooling. It has a theoretical processing speed of 100 teraflops.

It was built as stage five of the Advanced Simulation and Computing Program (ASC) started by the U.S. Department of Energy and the National Nuclear Security Administration to build a simulator to replace live WMD testing following the moratorium on testing started by President George H. W. Bush in 1992 and extended by Bill Clinton in 1993.
