= NUMAlink =

Computer network technology

- NUMAlink
- Year created: 1990 (as Stanford DASH), 1996 (as NUMAlink)
- Created by: Silicon Graphics
- Hotplugging interface: Optional

NUMAlink is a system interconnect developed by Silicon Graphics (SGI) for use in its distributed shared memory ccNUMA computer systems. NUMAlink was originally developed by SGI for their Origin 2000 and Onyx2 systems. At the time of these systems' introduction, it was branded as "CrayLink" during SGI's brief ownership of Cray Research.

Hewlett Packard Enterprise entered an original equipment manufacturer (OEM) arrangement with Silicon Graphics International (SGI) to use Numalink as the foundation in some mission critical servers.

Generation	Introduction	Bandwidth (Note: Bandwidth per port in each direction (each NUMAlink port is a dual simplex channel).)	Systems
Stanford DASH	~1990	0.12 GB/s (Note: DASH used separate request and reply mesh networks, so this bandwidth number is not directly comparable to NUMAlink.)	
NUMAlink 2	1996	0.8 GB/s	Origin 200, Origin 2000, Onyx2
NUMAlink 3	2000	1.6 GB/s	Origin 3000, Altix 3000
NUMAlink 4	2004	3.2 GB/s	Altix 4000
NUMAlink 5	2009	7.5 GB/s	Altix UV
NUMAlink 6	2012	6.7 GB/s	UV 2000, UV 3000, UV 30
NUMAlink 7	2014	14.9 GB/s	UV 30EX, UV 300 / HPE Integrity MC990 X
NUMAlink 8	2017	13.3 GB/s	(HPE) Superdome Flex
NUMAlink 9	2023	16.0 / 24.0 GB/s	Compute Scale-up Server 3200 / 3250

== NUMAlink 2 (Hub ASIC) ==
There was no NUMAlink 1, as SGI's engineers deemed the system interconnect used in the Stanford DASH to be the first generation NUMAlink interconnect. NUMAlink 2 (branded as CrayLink) was announced in October 1996 for the Onyx2 visualization systems, the Origin 200 and the Origin 2000 servers and supercomputers. The NUMAlink 2 interface is the Hub ASIC. NUMAlink 2 is capable of 1.6 GB/s of peak bandwidth through two 800 MB/s, PECL 400 MHz 16-bit unidirectional links.

== NUMAlink 3 (Bedrock ASIC) ==
NUMAlink 3 is the third generation of the interconnect, introduced in 2000 and used in the Origin 3000 and Altix 3000. NUMAlink 3 is capable of 3.2 GB/s of peak bandwidth through two 1.6 GB/s unidirectional links. The name NUMAflex reflects the modular design approach around this time.

== NUMAlink 4 (SHUB ASIC) ==
NUMAlink 4 is the fourth generation of the interconnect, introduced in 2004 and used in the Altix 4000. NUMAlink 4 is capable of 6.4 GB/s of peak bandwidth through two 3.2 GB/s unidirectional links.

== NUMAlink 5 (UV Hub ASIC) ==
NUMAlink 5 is the fifth generation of the interconnect, introduced in 2009 and used in the Altix UV series. NUMAlink 5 is capable of 15 GB/s of peak bandwidth through two 7.5 GB/s unidirectional links.

== NUMAlink 6 (UV2 Hub ASIC) ==
NUMAlink 6 is the sixth generation of the interconnect, introduced in 2012 and used in the SGI UV 2000, SGI UV 3000, SGI UV 30. NUMAlink 6 is capable of 6.7 GB/s of bidirectional peak bandwidth for up to 256 socket system and 64TB of coherent shared memory.

== NUMAlink 7 (HARP ASIC) ==
NUMAlink 7 is the seventh generation of the interconnect, introduced in 2014 and used in the HPE Integrity MC990 X/SGI UV 300, SGI UV 30EX, SGI UV 300H, SGI UV 300RL. NUMAlink 7 is capable of 14.94 GB/s of bidirectional peak bandwidth for up to 64 socket system and 64TB of coherent shared memory.

== NUMAlink 8 (Flex ASIC) ==
NUMAlink 8 is the eighth generation of the interconnect, introduced in 2017 and used in the HPE Superdome Flex with Intel Xeon Scalable first and second generations (Skylake and Cascade Lake). NUMAlink 8 provides 13.3 GB/s of bandwidth per port and systems using it are capable of 853.33 GB/s of bisection peak bandwidth (64 links are cut) across a 32 socket system with up to 48 TB of coherent shared memory.

== NUMAlink 9 (XNC ASIC) ==
NUMAlink 9 is the ninth generation of the interconnect, introduced in 2023 and used in the HPE Compute Scale-up Server 3200 / 3250. NUMAlink 9 provides 16.0 / 24.0 GB/s of bandwidth per port and systems using it are capable of up to 768.0 / 1152.0 GB/s of bisection peak bandwidth (48 links are cut) across a 16 socket system with up to 32 / 64 TB of coherent shared memory.

== See also ==
- List of device bit rates
- Compute Express Link
- InfiniBand
- RapidIO
- Myrinet
- QsNet II
- QuickRing
