= RealityEngine =

3D graphics hardware architecture

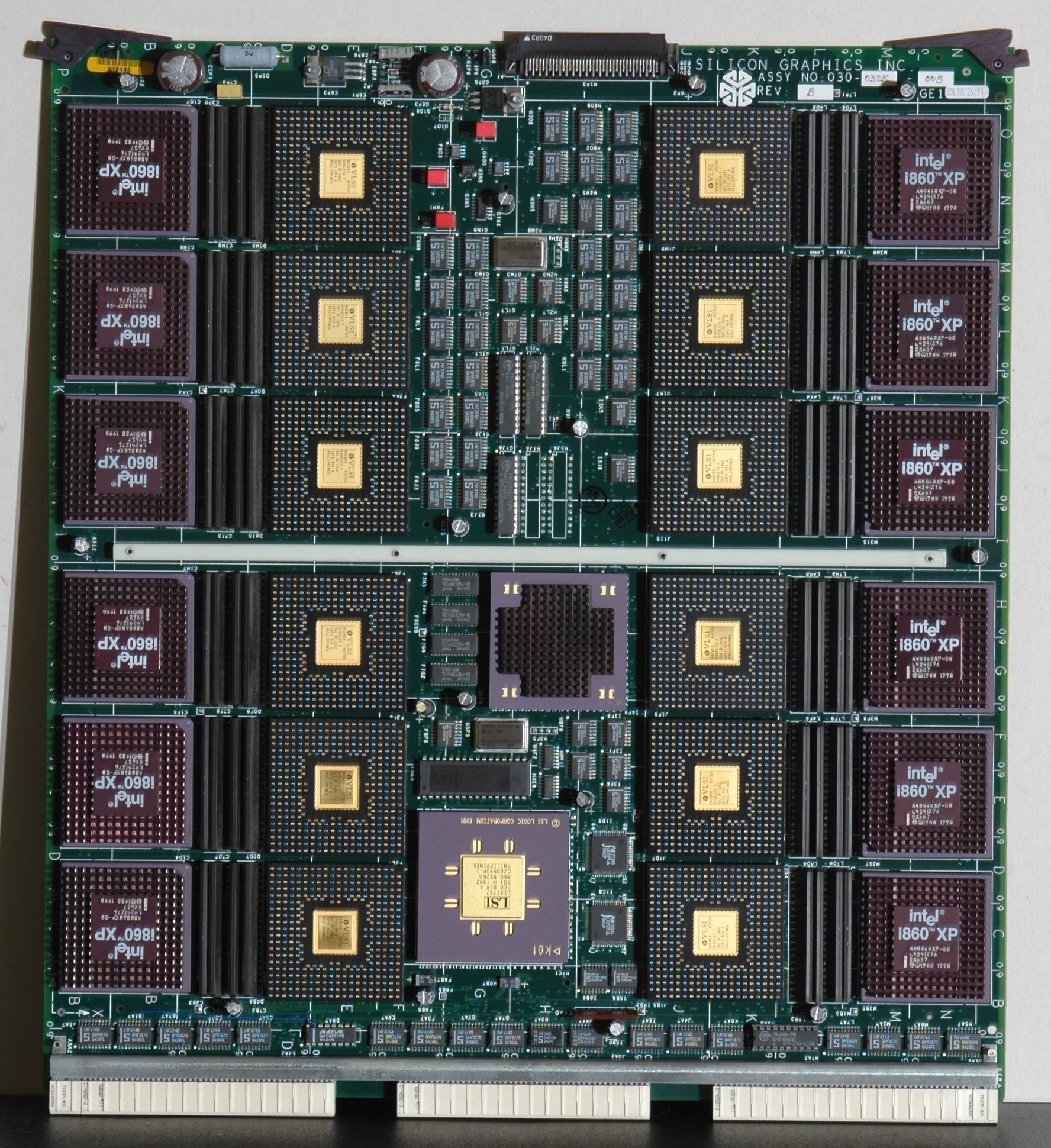
- Geometry Engine board.
- Release date: 1992; 34 years ago
- Designed by: Silicon Graphics

Cards
- Mid-range: VTX
- High-end: RealityEngine
- Enthusiast: RealityEngine2

History
- Successor: InfiniteReality

Support status
- Unsupported

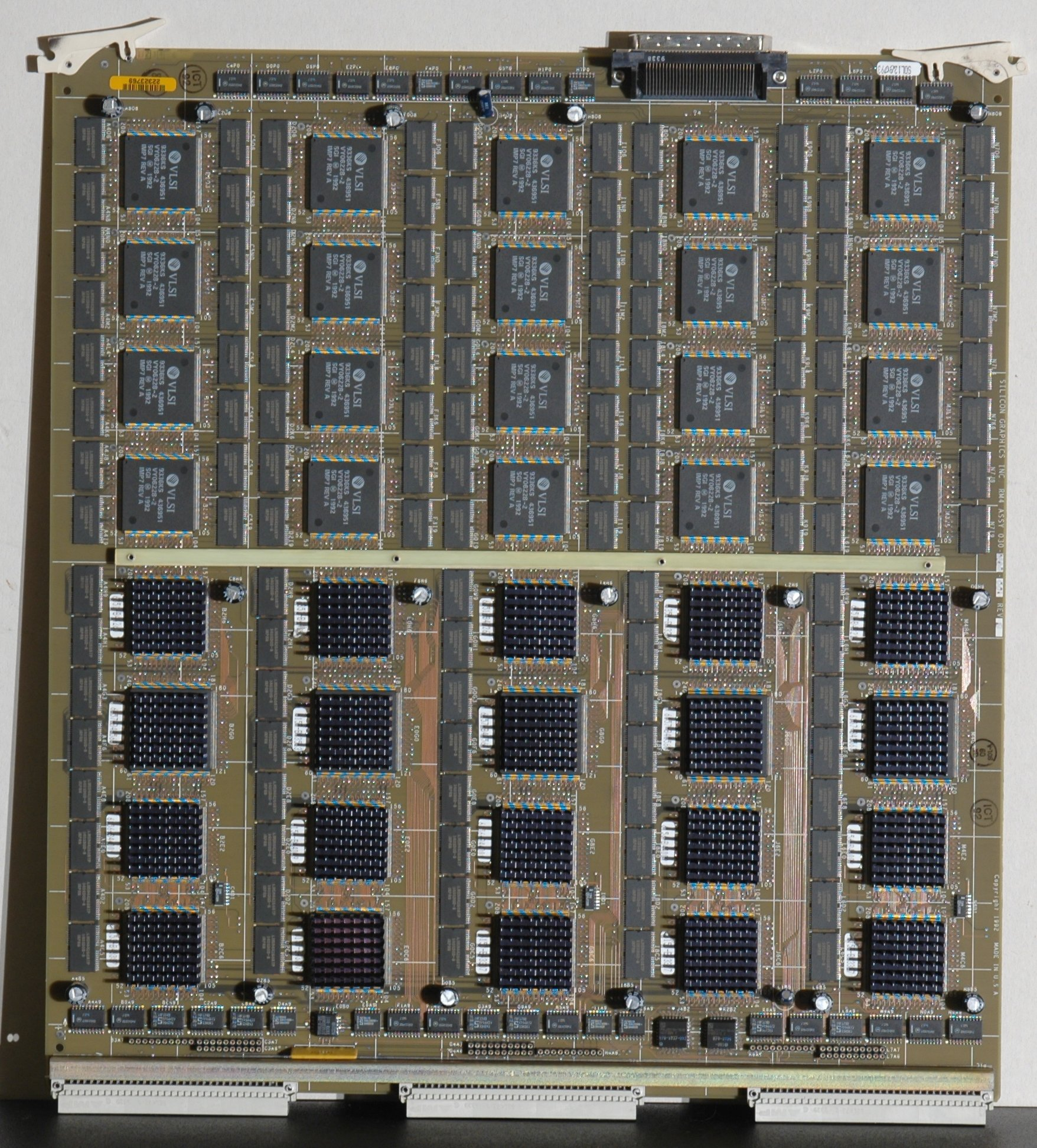
Raster Manager board.

RealityEngine is a 3D graphics hardware architecture and a family of graphics systems which was developed and manufactured by Silicon Graphics during the early to mid 1990s. RealityEngine was positioned as the company's high-end visualization hardware for its MIPS/IRIX platform. RealityEngine is designed for deployment exclusively within the company's Crimson and Onyx family of visualization systems, which are sometimes referred to as "graphics supercomputers" or "visualization supercomputers". The RealityEngine was marketed to large organizations, such as companies and universities that are involved in computer simulation, digital content creation, engineering and research.

It was succeeded by the InfiniteReality in early 1996, but coexisted with it for a time as an entry-level option for older systems.

== RealityEngine ==
The RealityEngine is a board set comprising a Geometry Engine board, up to four Raster Manager boards, and a DG2 Display Generator board. These boards plug into a midplane on the host system.

The Geometry Engine is based on the 50 MHz Intel i860XP.

=== VTX ===
The VTX is a cost-reduced RealityEngine and as a consequence, its features and performance are below that of the RealityEngine. It is not the VGX or VGXT board set. The name is said to stand for Venice Too eXpensive, Venice being the internal name for RealityEngine.

== RealityEngine2 ==
The RealityEngine2, stylized as "RealityEngine^{2}", is an upgraded RealityEngine with twelve instead of eight Geometry Engines. The Reality Station workstation is based on RealityEngine2. In February 1995, SGI reduced the entry price of Reality Station to US$179,540 (equivalent to about $379,400 in 2025).

RealityEngine2 was succeeded by the InfiniteReality in early 1996. It uses the GE10 Geometry Engine board, RM4 Raster Manager board and DG2 Display Generator board.
