= Stanford DASH =

1980s multiprocessor for shared memory

Stanford DASH was a cache coherent multiprocessor developed in the late 1980s by a group led by Anoop Gupta, John L. Hennessy, Mark Horowitz, and Monica S. Lam at Stanford University. It was based on adding a pair of directory boards designed at Stanford to up to 16 SGI IRIS 4D Power Series machines and then cabling the systems in a mesh topology using a Stanford-modified version of the Torus Routing Chip. The boards designed at Stanford implemented a directory-based cache coherence protocol allowing Stanford DASH to support distributed shared memory for up to 64 processors. Stanford DASH was also notable for both supporting and helping to formalize weak memory consistency models, including release consistency. Because Stanford DASH was the first operational machine to include scalable cache coherence, it influenced subsequent computer science research as well as the commercially available SGI Origin 2000. Stanford DASH is included in the 25th anniversary retrospective of selected papers from the International Symposium on Computer Architecture and several computer science books, has been simulated by the University of Edinburgh, and is used as a case study in contemporary computer science classes.
