= SGI Onyx =

Supercomputer series

Onyx
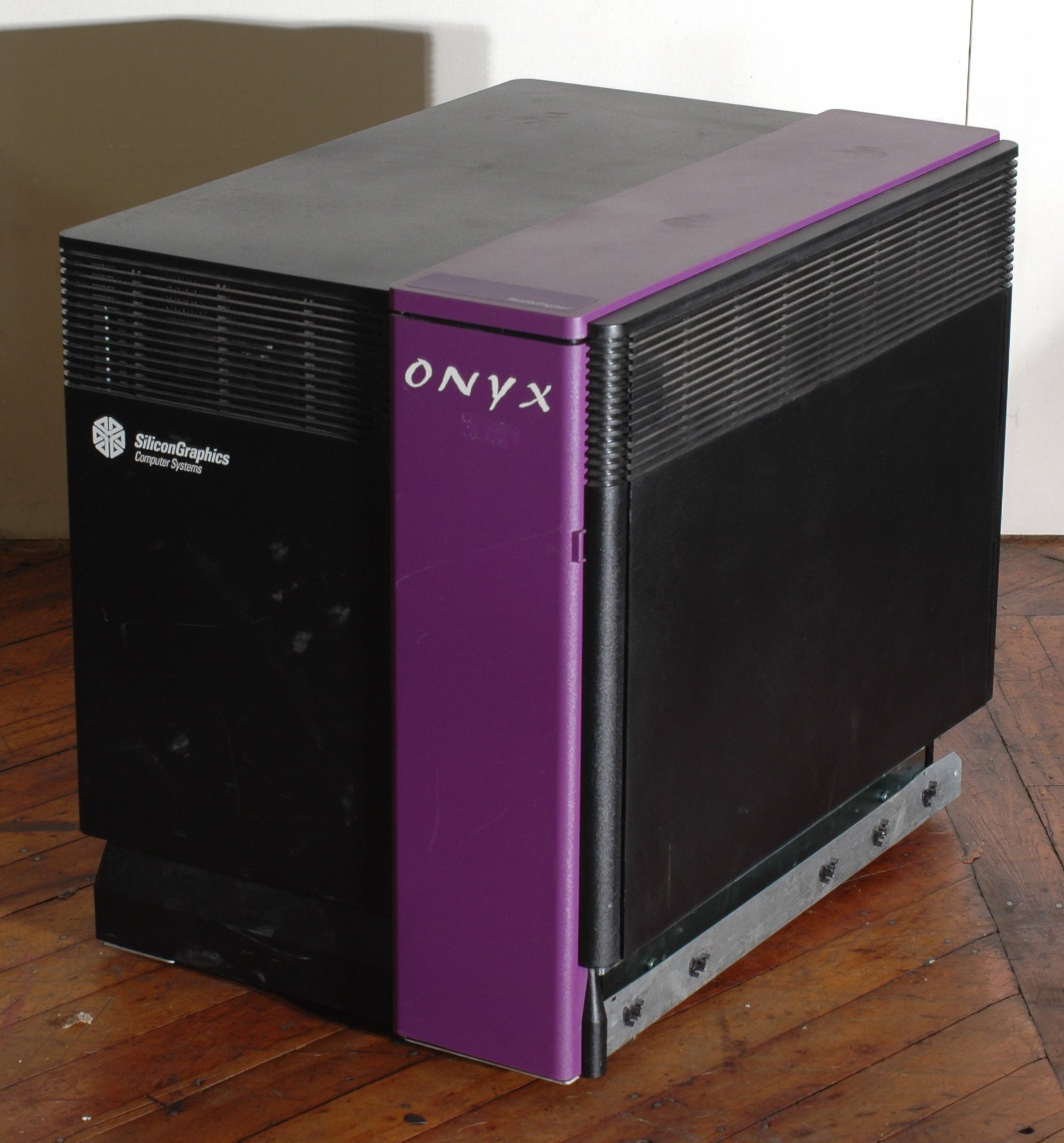
- Deskside Onyx
- Manufacturer: Silicon Graphics, Inc.
- Type: Graphics supercomputer
- Released: January 1993; 33 years ago
- Introductory price: US$119,900–594,900 (with VTX graphics); US$159,900—634,900 (with RealityEngine2)
- Discontinued: March 31, 1999
- Operating system: IRIX 5.0–6.5.22 (for R10000 CPU models)
- CPU: MIPS R4400, MIPS R10000
- Memory: 64 MB to 16 GB
- Storage: Up to 30 GB internal and 2 TB total
- Graphics: VTX; RealityEngine2
- Platform: MIPS
- Predecessor: SGI Crimson
- Successor: SGI Onyx2
- Related: SGI Challenge
- Website: sgi.com at the Wayback Machine (archived 1997-06-05)

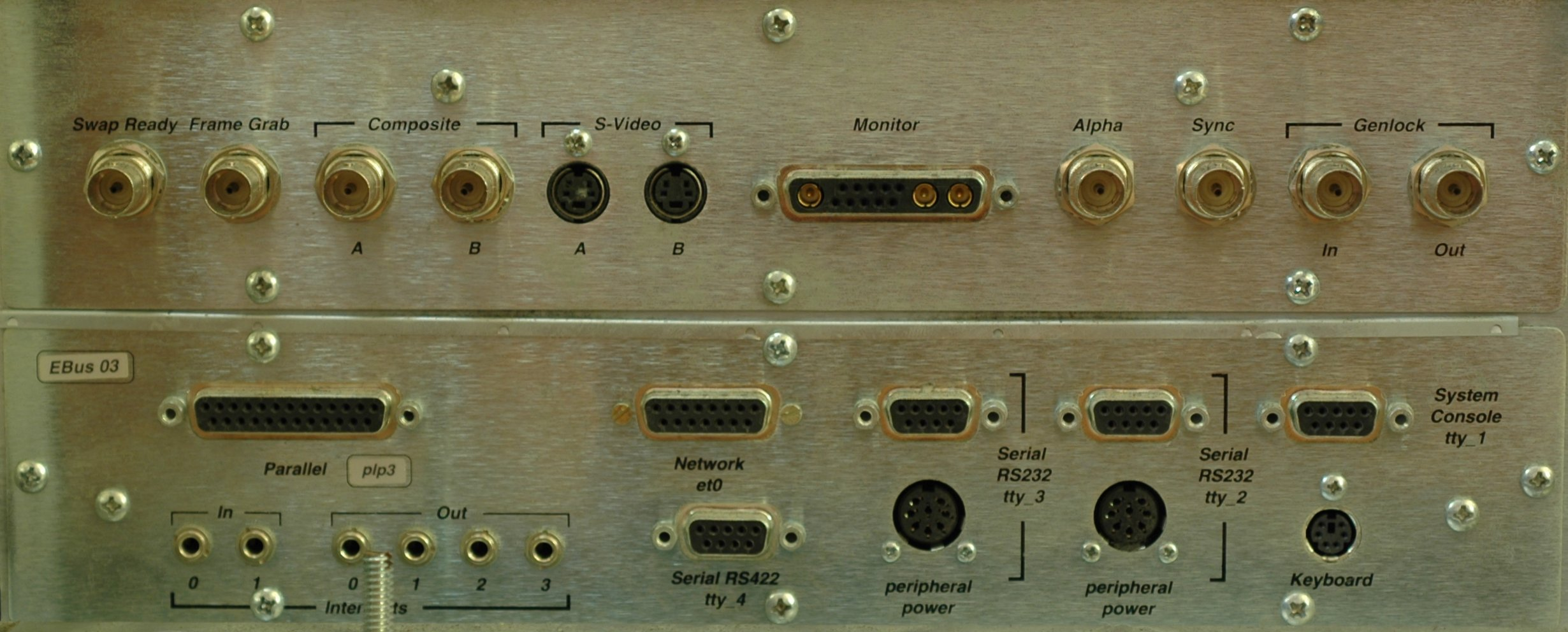
Onyx IO Ports

Onyx is a series of visualization systems designed and manufactured by SGI, introduced in 1993 and offered in two models, deskside and rackmount, codenamed Eveready and Terminator respectively. Onyx's basic system architecture is based on the SGI Challenge servers, but with graphics hardware.

Onyx was used for one of the first television broadcasts of real-time 3D computer graphics, in the 1994 US national elections. Onyx was the basis of development of Nintendo 64 hardware and games, launched in 1996.

Onyx was succeeded by the Onyx2 in 1996 and was discontinued on March 31, 1999.

== CPU ==
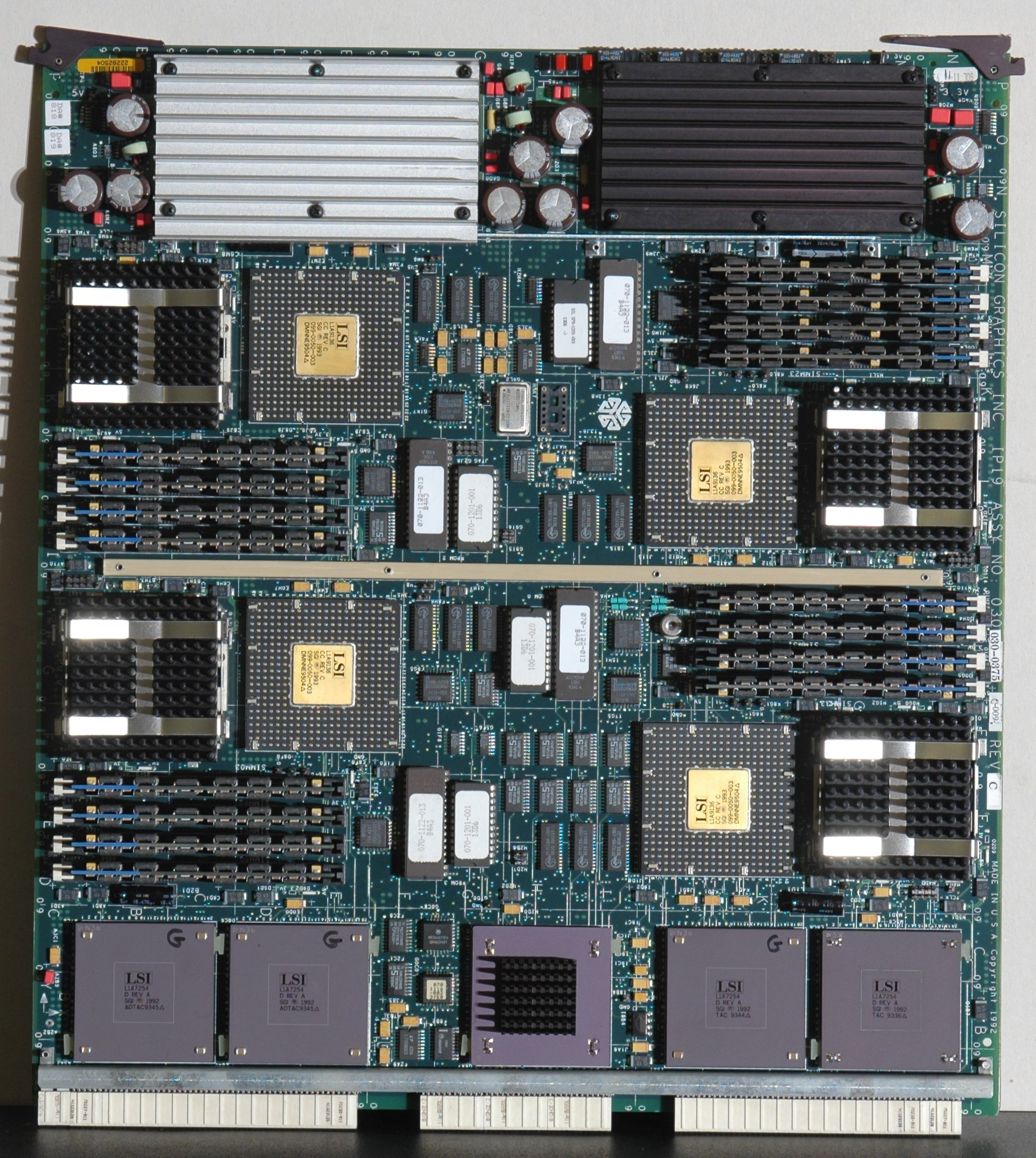
IP19 with quad R4400s

The deskside variant can accept one CPU board, and the rackmount variant can take up to six CPU boards. Both models were launched with the IP19 CPU board with one, two, or four MIPS R4400 CPUs, initially with 100 and 150 MHz options and later increased to 200 and 250 MHz. Later, the IP21 CPU board was introduced, with one or two R8000 microprocessors at 75 or 90 MHz; machines with this board were referred to as POWER Onyx. Finally, SGI introduced the IP25 board with one, two, or four R10000 CPUs at 195 MHz.

== Graphics ==
The Onyx was launched with the RealityEngine2 or VTX graphics subsystems, and InfiniteReality was introduced in 1995.

=== RealityEngine2 ===
The RealityEngine2 is the original high-end graphics subsystem for the Onyx and was found in two different versions: deskside and rack. The deskside model has one GE10 (Geometry Engine) board with 12 Intel i860XP processors, up to four RM4 or RM5 (Raster Manager) boards, and a DG2 (Display Generator) board. The rack model differs by supporting up to three RealityEngine2 pipes (display outputs) vs the single pipe of the deskside.

==== VTX ====
The VTX graphics subsystem is a cost reduced version of the RealityEngine2, using the same hardware but in a feature reduced configuration that can not be upgraded. It consists of one GE10 board (6 Intel i860XP processors vs 12 in RE2), a single RM4 or RM5 board, and a DG2 board.

=== InfiniteReality ===
InfiniteReality succeeded RealityEngine2 as the high-end graphics subsystem for the Onyx when introduced in 1996. As with RealityEngine2, two versions correspond to the form factors of the Onyx. The deskside version consists of a GE12 board, one or two RM6 boards (limited due to the amount of cooling the deskside system provides), and a DG4 board. The rack model increases the number of RM6 boards supported to four per pipe and allows up to three pipes to be installed resulting in an Onyx rack with a maximum of three GE12 boards, three DG4 boards, and twelve RM6 boards.

== Usage ==
Onyx was used by CBS News for a broadcast of real-time results for the 1994 US national elections. The broadcast had 3D graphics that were generated live that had updated news feeds, composited with video, in real time. The Onyx had four 64-bit R4400 CPUs, 128MB RAM, RealityEngine2, and Sirius Video board, to replace a room full of other equipment used in 1992. This is one of the first examples of a real-time 3D video compositing system used in a television broadcast.

The Onyx was employed in early 1995 for software development kit for the Nintendo 64. The new Onyx comprised most of the kit's impressively high price of US$100,000 to US$250,000.
