= SGI Origin 200 =

Entry-level server by Silicon Graphics

Origin 200
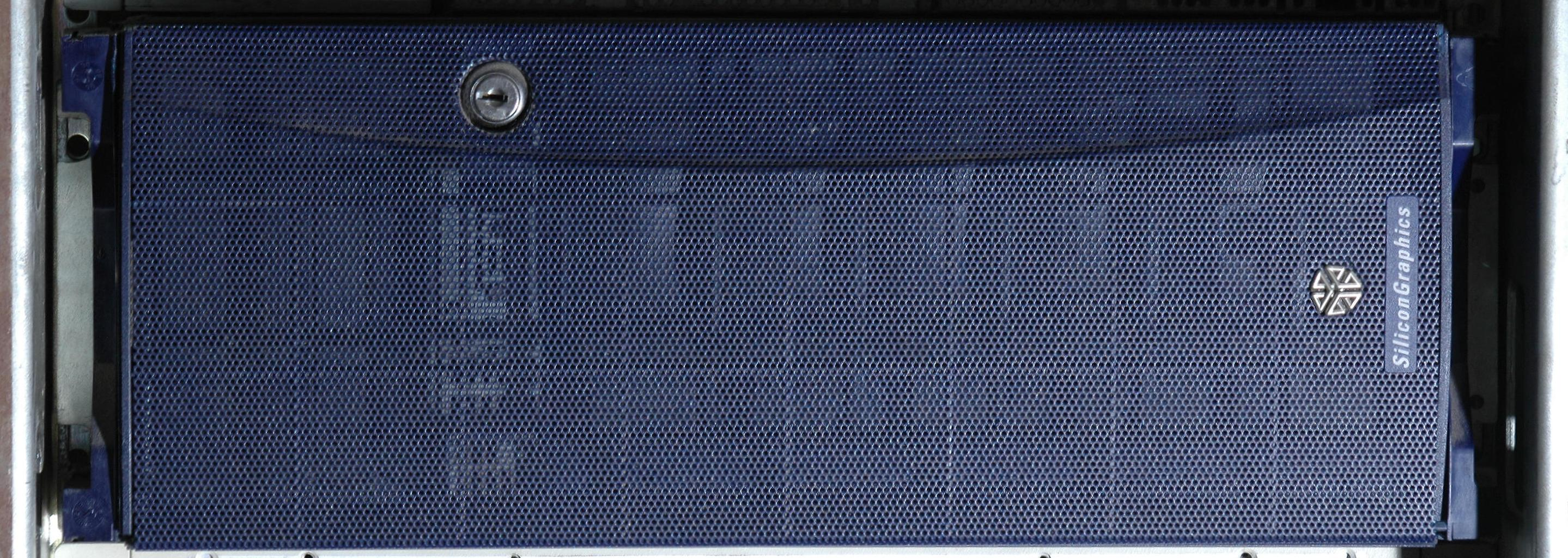
- Origin-200
- Developer: Silicon Graphics
- Type: Server
- Released: October 1996; 29 years ago
- Discontinued: 30 June 2002
- Operating system: IRIX
- CPU: MIPS R10000, MIPS R12000
- Memory: 32 MB–2 GB
- Predecessor: SGI Challenge M
- Successor: Origin 300
- Related: SGI Origin 2000
- Website: sgi.com

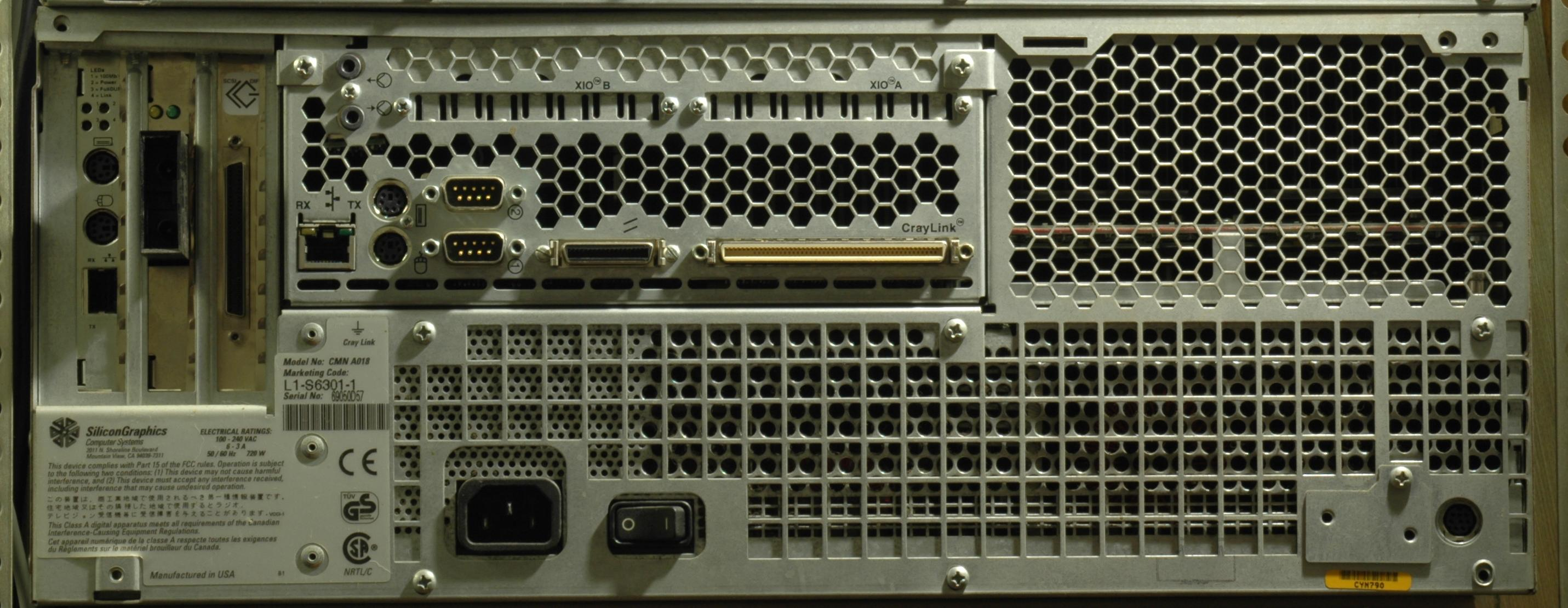
Rear View

The SGI Origin 200, code named Speedo, was an entry-level server computer developed and manufactured by SGI, introduced in October 1996 to accompany their mid-range and high-end Origin 2000. It is based on the same architecture as the Origin 2000 but has an unrelated hardware implementation. At the time of introduction, these systems ran the IRIX 6.4, and later, the IRIX 6.5 operating systems. The Origin 200 was discontinued on 30 June 2002.

== Hardware ==
The Origin 200 consists of one or two modules. In configurations with two modules, the NUMAlink 2 (originally CrayLink) interconnection fabric is used to connect the two modules together. Using two modules, the Origin 200's capabilities (the number of processors, the amount of memory, etc.) is doubled. The Origin 200 and the Origin 200 GIGAchannel enclosures can be configured as a tower with "skins" that covered the bare metal for cosmetic purposes, or as a rackmountable enclosure compatible with 19- or 21-inch racks. An optional drive enclosure that holds up to six 3.5-inch drives and either one full-height 5.25-inch drive or two half-height 5.25-inch drives can also be added.

== Module ==
Each module contains a motherboard, seven 3.5-inch drive bays and two 5.25-inch drive bays. In configurations where an Origin 200 GIGAchannel expansion cabinet is used, the module also contains a Crosstown board that plugs into the motherboard. Each module was limited to two CPUs.

=== Motherboard ===
The motherboard contains the Hub ASIC, a PCI bridge, two SCSI controllers, two UARTs and an Ethernet controller. The PCI bridge provides the PCI bus for the three PCI-X slots and the I/O controllers.

=== Processor ===
The processor(s) are located on a PIMM (Processor-Included Memory Module) that plugs into the motherboard. When first introduced, the Origin 200 supported one or two R10000 processors with 1 or 4 MB L2 cache each. In August 1998, an upgraded PIMM featuring the 225 MHz R10000 processors was introduced. Later, 270 MHz R12000 processors became available. The PIMMs come in two versions: single processor and dual processor. It is not possible to upgrade these systems to a dual processor system by using two single processor PIMMs, as there is only one PIMM connector on the motherboard.

=== Memory ===
The motherboard supports 32 MB to 2 GB of memory through eight DIMM slots organised into four banks. DIMMs with capacities of 16, 32, 64 and 256 MB are supported. DIMMs must be installed in pairs.

== GIGAchannel ==
The Origin 200 GIGAchannel is an expansion cabinet that connects to the Origin 200 modules via two XIO cables. It provides an additional four PCI-X slots and five XIO slots. The GIGAchannel contains a Crossbow (Xbow) ASIC, which is an eight-port crossbar provides the five datapaths to the five XIO slots and a single datapath to PCI bridge. The remaining two ports on the ASIC are connected to the XIO connectors used to interface the subsystem to the Origin 200 modules.
