= IrisVision =

Computer graphics card

- Release date: 1991; 35 years ago
- Designed by: Silicon Graphics, Pellucid

Support status
- Unsupported

IrisVision is an expansion card developed by Silicon Graphics for IBM compatible PCs in 1991 and is one of the first 3D accelerator cards available for the high end PC market. IrisVision is an adaptation of the graphics pipeline from the Personal IRIS workstation to the Micro Channel architecture and consumer ISA buses of most modern PCs of the day. It has the first variant of IRIS GL ported to the PC, predating OpenGL.

== History ==
In 1988, Silicon Graphics introduced the MIPS-based workstation computer, the Personal IRIS series. A few years later, IBM licensed both the graphics subsystem and the (then new) IRIS Graphics Library (IRIS GL) API for their RS/6000 POWERstation line of POWER1-based workstations. IrisVision was an unintended offshoot of SGI's attempts to port the subsystem to IBM's Micro Channel Architecture. They found it was much easier to debug the prototype implementations on an IBM PS/2.

To quote R.C. Brown:

At some point, the light went off in someone's head; "Why don't we sell this board set for use in PCs?". IrisVision was born. Initially, the MCA card was re-designed to offer some features critical for the PC market, including standard 15-pin VGA-style video output and a 15-pin VGA passthrough input connector. The IBM genlock connector was moved to the top of the card, and stereo display signals were also brought out to the VGA passthrough connector. The card occupied 1 32-bit MCA slot and an adjacent 16/32 bit slot. One or two daughter boards provided framebuffer and z-buffer memory.
Work then began on the design of an Industry Standard Architecture (ISA or AT-bus) version of the card. It would occupy 2 16-bit ISA slots and use the identical daughter cards as the MCA (and IBM) versions of the board set.

The IrisVision was spun off as Pellucid, which later was taken over by Media Vision.

== Overview ==
Not unlike its Personal IRIS variant, IrisVision is capable of 8-bit and 24-bit raster images with a 24-bit Z buffer. The difference is in integration with a fifth generation Geometry Engine without having to upgrade the cards. Around the same time, SGI was preparing to introduce the next series of graphics cards for its IRIS Indigo workstations, called "Express Graphics", which came in two variants for the Personal IRIS: Turbo Graphix and the Elan Graphics pipeline, both of them an evolution of IrisVision.

At this time, SGI was moving forward to 64-bit microprocessors on its own platform. To take advantage of the 80386 and 80486's 32-bit extensions and to enable large memory up to 2 GB, IrisVision came with a proprietary 32-bit C compiler and the PharLap 32-bit DOS extender. Due to the nature of the pipeline, all execution calls to IRIS GL are displayed in full screen. MS-DOS has no GUI, so this left programmers to write their interfaces in pure IRIS GL.

3D graphics hardware was a relatively new prospect for microcomputers at the time, and was unknown in the IBM personal computing world. 3D graphics software was mostly associated with PowerAnimator and Softimage or niche applications on the Amiga 3000, such as Video Toaster and Lightwave, or the Macintosh Quadra, such as StrataVision, and 3D graphics hardware was frequently associated with UNIX machines. In contrast, in the IBM personal computing world, VGA was just barely coming into the spotlight when IrisVision came out on the market. IrisVision presented an alternative few had ever imagined on the Intel platform: that of a 3D platform that used MS-DOS as the base operating system.

AutoDesk quickly realized that it could capitalize on this graphics subsystem and released their most successful CAD and 3D production products with support for this card, among them AutoCAD (Revisions 12 and 13) and 3D studio 2 through 4. Eventually support for Microsoft Windows would be developed but hardly any software on the GUI system would take advantage of the card.

IrisVision fell into relative obscurity, as IRIS GL hadn't reached its pinnacle as the default 3D API then was PHIGS, and few people had any real idea of what to do with 3D graphics (outside of the CAD industry). Another attempt to port SGI hardware to the PC platform would not occur until the introduction of the SGI Visual Workstation.

== Technical specification ==
- Display resolutions: 1280×1024, 1024×768, 640×480 (NTSC), 768×576 (PAL), 1280×472 stereoscopic (for each eye)
- Color depth: 24-bit
- Z buffer: 24-bit
- Bus support: MCA, ISA
- Programming interface: IRIS GL
- Supported operating systems: MS-DOS, SCO Open Desktop, Windows 3.0

To support standard PC applications, IrisVision was providing a pass-through to which the VGA card was connected (a similar solution was later used by 3dfx Voodoo graphics).

== See also ==
- Elan Graphics
- Extreme Graphics - Supplanted Express Graphics cards
- IMPACT (computer graphics) - Supplanted Extreme Graphics cards
- SGI VPro - First present on the Octane2 and continued on to Fuel and Tezro Platforms
- Quadro - Nvidia cards for SGI PC-based workstations
