= Timeline of early 3D computer graphics hardware =

Timeline of early 3D graphics hardware

This is a timeline of dedicated 3D computer graphics hardware that uses something other than the general purpose CPU of a computer to draw graphics in three dimensions, usually on a two-dimensional standard display, although sometimes on a three-dimensional display like VR goggles. This is a form of hardware acceleration.

In other words, the basic feature is that 3D graphics hardware handles the 3D projection - but possibly for output on a regular display. This is related to the modern term graphics processing unit (GPU) where all the hallmark features of modern 3D hardware appear on a single chip.

The list stops with the release of mainstream 3D graphics cards and the PlayStation and its Toshiba-designed GPU in 1994.

"Matrix multiplier", "vector processor", "tensor processor", "3D accelerator", "Geometry Engine", and "geometry pipeline" all have related meanings.

== Timeline ==
=== 1960s ===
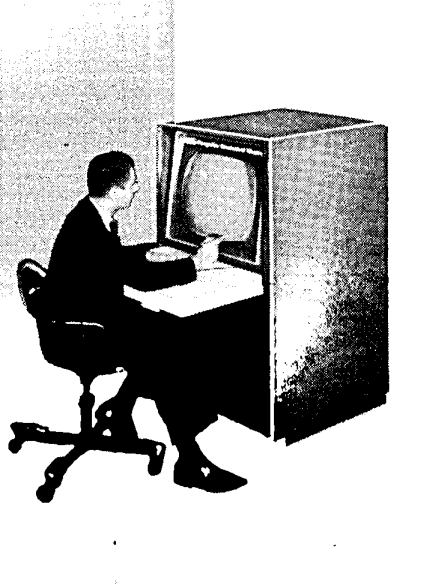
The RMS Associates Computer-Controlled Display, or CCD, introduced in November 1963.

==== 1963 ====
- MIT's TX-2 computer used to showcase primitive wireframe 3D and hidden line capability with Sketchpad III by Ivan Sutherland.
- RMS Associates, later Information Displays Inc., introduces the Computer Controlled Display. Light pen offered as a peripheral.

==== 1966 ====
- Information Displays Inc. introduces the IDI IDIIOM (Information Displays, Inc. Input-Output Machine). Gordon Romney of the University of Utah uses the terminal to produce the first shaded 3D renders that fall.

==== 1967 ====
- Adage graphics terminals such as the AGT/30 with dedicated analog matrix multipliers

==== 1968 ====
- Ivan Sutherland's Sword of Damocles augmented reality headset, driven by the rather outdated DEC PDP-1, becomes functional at Harvard.
- Evans & Sutherland Computer Corporation, the first company focused exclusively on computer graphics products, is founded by David Evans and Ivan Sutherland in Salt Lake City, Utah.

==== 1969 ====
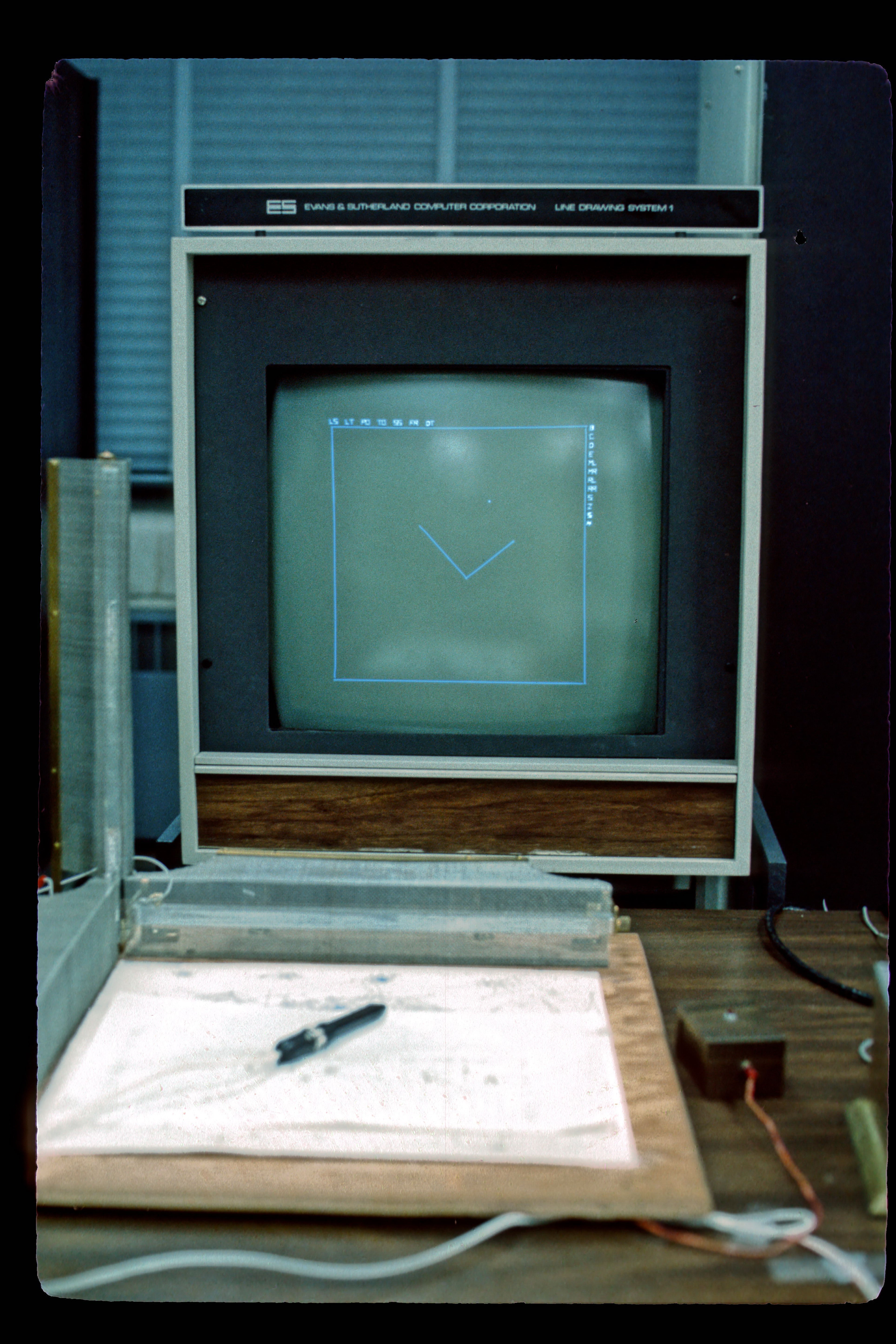
E&S LDS-1

- Evans & Sutherland (E&S) Line Drawing System-1 (LDS-1) introduced. First all-digital system to provide matrix multiplication and 3D capability, therefore could be considered the first "graphics processing unit" on the commercial market. First LDS-1 unit delivered to Bolt, Beranek & Newman in August 1969, another goes to NASA Ames, and a third to Princeton.
- Low-cost graphics terminal IMLAC PDS-1 introduced at the November 1969 Fall Joint Computer Conference. Later saw use as an early 3D gaming machine with the likes of Maze War.

=== 1970s ===
==== 1970 ====
- On New Year's Day, January 1, 1970, the first complete test of a successor head-mounted AR/VR system to Sutherland's Sword of Damocles, termed The Sorcerer's Apprentice, becomes fully operational at the University of Utah. According to contemporary accounts, this timing was due to the availability of time-sharing resources on the driving computer, not being utilized by the other students who were out partying. This system surpassed the 1968 Sword of Damocles by adding the ability to interact with scenes via the "Lincoln Wand," developed by Larry Roberts at MIT's Lincoln Laboratories in 1963, which enabled virtual object manipulation with a 3D pointer controlled by the wand.

==== 1971 ====
- Evans & Sutherland introduces a successor product to the LDS-1, the Line Drawing System 2, or LDS-2. The first unit goes to Case Western Reserve University in 1972 (see below), and another goes to NASA Ames, making the latter the only facility with both an E&S LDS-1 and LDS-2.
- Aaron Marcus begins development on Cybernetic Landscapes (see below).
- A short silent color film showing movement through a virtual 3D campus, termed Cornell in Perspective, is made at Cornell University using the custom-built polygon rendering hardware developed at General Electric's Electronic Laboratory in Syracuse, NY.

==== 1972 ====
- PLATO IV system becomes operational at the University of Illinois Urbana-Champaign. Between around 1973 and 1978, several networked multiplayer wireframe 3D games are implemented and popularized by users of the system, such as Spasim.
- E&S Continuous Tone 1 (CT1) "Watkins box" system (consisting of an E&S LDS-2 and Shaded Picture System) delivered to Case Western Reserve University. First real-time Gouraud shading machine. In 1975, an Gouraud-shaded 3D animation of a sphere eversion was created at CWRU, and is available to view here.

==== 1973 ====
- E&S Picture System 1 (along with optional Shaded Picture System) offered in August issue of Datamation.
- Aaron Marcus completes implementation of Cybernetic Landscapes, an artwork consisting of a series of three interactive 3D environments, using the E&S LDS-1 at Princeton.

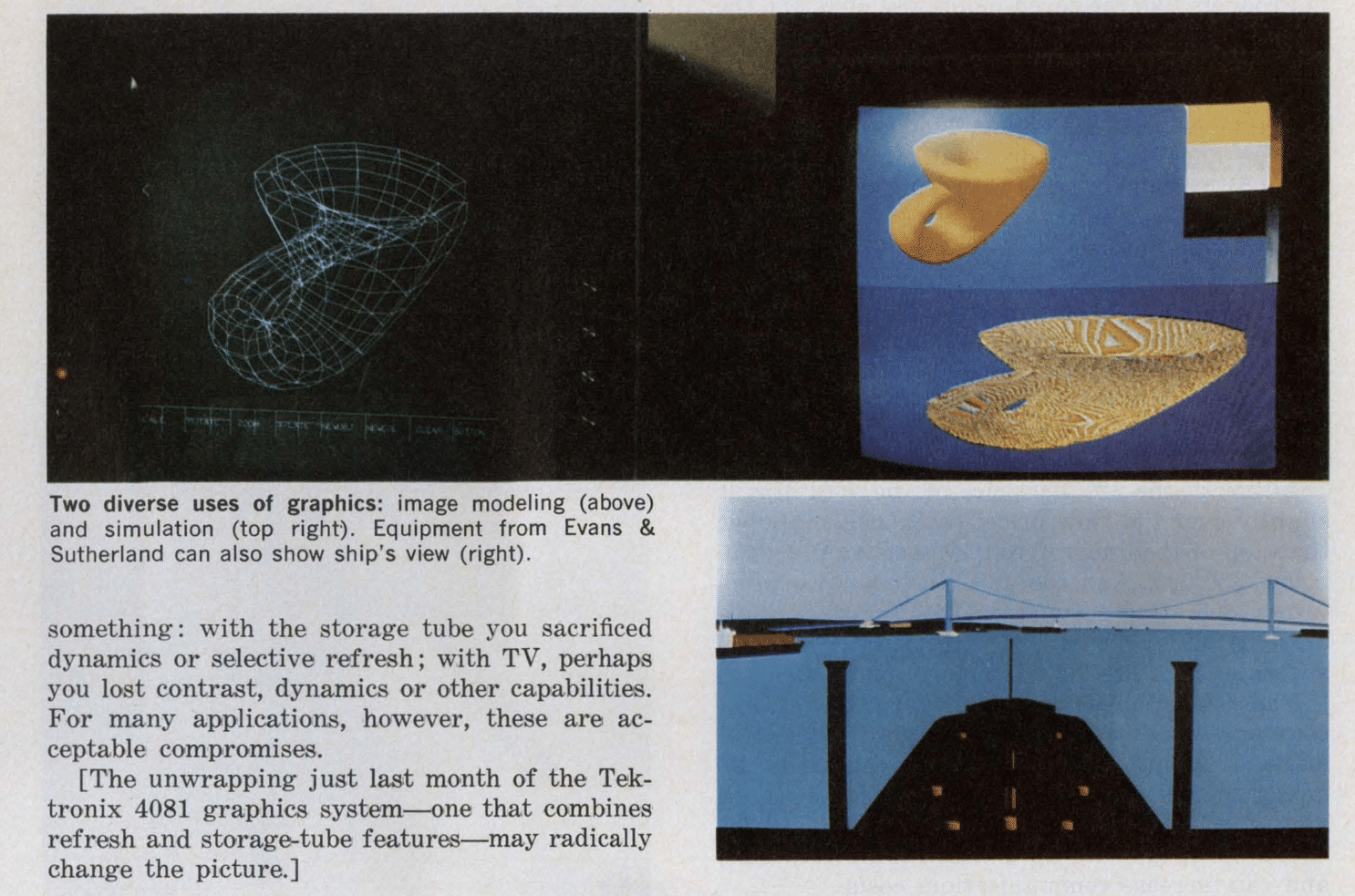
An E&S Picture System 1 (top left) combined with a raster framebuffer produces the smoothly shaded image (top right), first rendered in May 1975. The Continuous Tone 2 (E&S CT2) system, delivered to the CAORF in 1975, produces a full 3D scene for interactive harbor simulation (bottom right).

==== 1974 ====
- A practical shaded 3D graphics algorithm implemented in software on low-cost, general purpose computers becomes operational at John Staudhammer's Graphics Lab at North Carolina State University.

==== 1975 ====
- A joint effort between Evans & Sutherland Computer Corporation and the University of Utah's computer graphics department results in the first ever MOSFET video framebuffer, capable of color and smooth shading.

==== 1977 ====
- E&S Continuous Tone 4 (CT4) system delivered to Lufthansa for pilot training using computer simulation. First graphics system capable of real-time texture mapping. Apart from the CT4 and CT1 at Case Western, a CT2 went to the Computer-Aided Operations Research Facility (CAORF) at the U.S. Merchant Marine Academy in 1975 for harbor simulation, and a CT3 was purchased by NASA in 1976.

==== 1979 ====
- Vectorbeam releases the first video game with true 3D graphics available to consumers, the vector-based Speed Freak. Vectorbeam’s founder, Larry Rosenthal, was an MIT graduate and had patented the custom vector display hardware used in their games.
- Ikonas graphics systems with 8- and 24-bit graphics and 3D acceleration
- I, Robot is conceptualized as Ice World at Atari. It is originally planned to be a shaded 3D driving simulator, and include stopping at rest stations to play minigames in the format of virtual arcade machines.

=== 1980s ===
==== 1981 ====
- Pixel Planes experimental design with very large scale (VLSI) application-specific integrated circuits (ASICs)

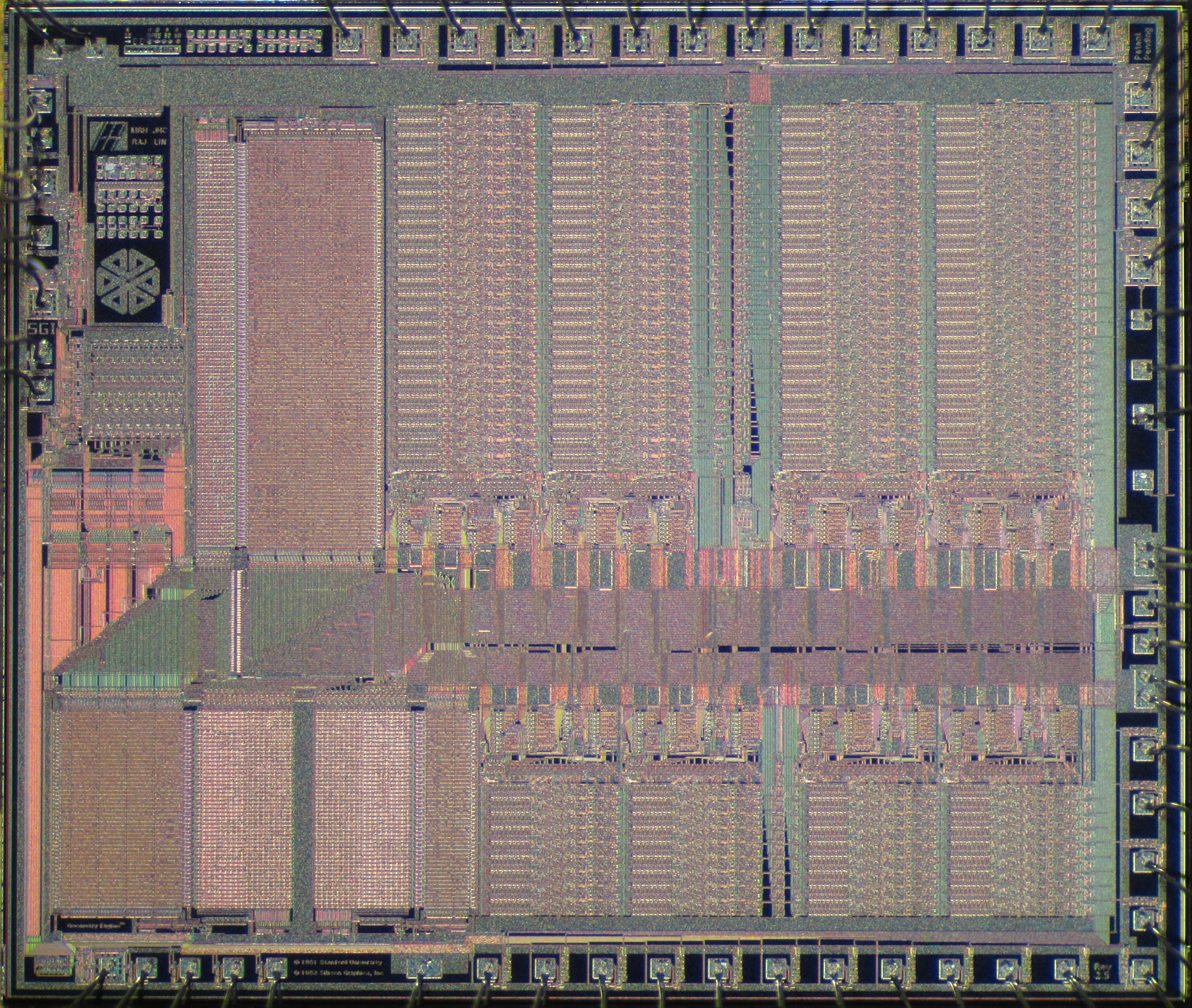
Geometry Engine integrated circuit

- The Geometry Engine, a VLSI ASIC vector processor intended for 3D graphics, was designed by Jim Clark and Marc Hannah at Stanford University under ARPA contract. It was capable of approximately 6 million operations per second.
- Several functional prototypes of Atari’s Ice World are tested in October. According to the original developers, the game was nearly complete by this point; however, Atari brass urges further reworks, delaying the game’s debut as I, Robot to the summer of 1984.

==== 1983 ====
- Silicon Graphics's IRIS 1000, a terminal with hardware 3D graphics based on the Geometry Engine
- Simutrek’s Cube Quest is introduced to the public as the first arcade game to include shaded 3D graphics, which were combined with elaborate LaserDisc backgrounds.

==== 1984 ====
- I, Robot, the first video game rendered entirely in real-time shaded 3D polygons, debuts in June, equipped with several completely custom-built PCBs for geometry processing and rendering.

==== 1985 ====
- IBM Professional Graphics Controller (PGC) released, designed by Curtis Priem, later co-founder of Nvidia, at Vermont Microsystems. It offered rudimentary 2D and 3D acceleration rendered by a dedicated CPU on the graphics card, with 640 × 480 resolution and 8-bit color depth (256 colors on screen). It went on to inspire both the 9-pin RGB connector sometimes used for VGA, as well as a number of similar 3D graphics cards with various ASICs for acceleration.
- IBM 3250 graphics terminal with 3D acceleration
- SGI IRIS Unix workstation with Geometry Engine

==== 1986 ====
- PGC derivatives from Everex, Matrox, NEC, Orchid, Paradise, Vermont Microsystems

==== 1987 ====
- MAGIC VLSI design with transform and lighting
- Raster Technologies Vertex Processor
- Matrox SM-640 incorporates Geometry Engine licensed from SGI in PC 3D accelerator

==== 1988 ====
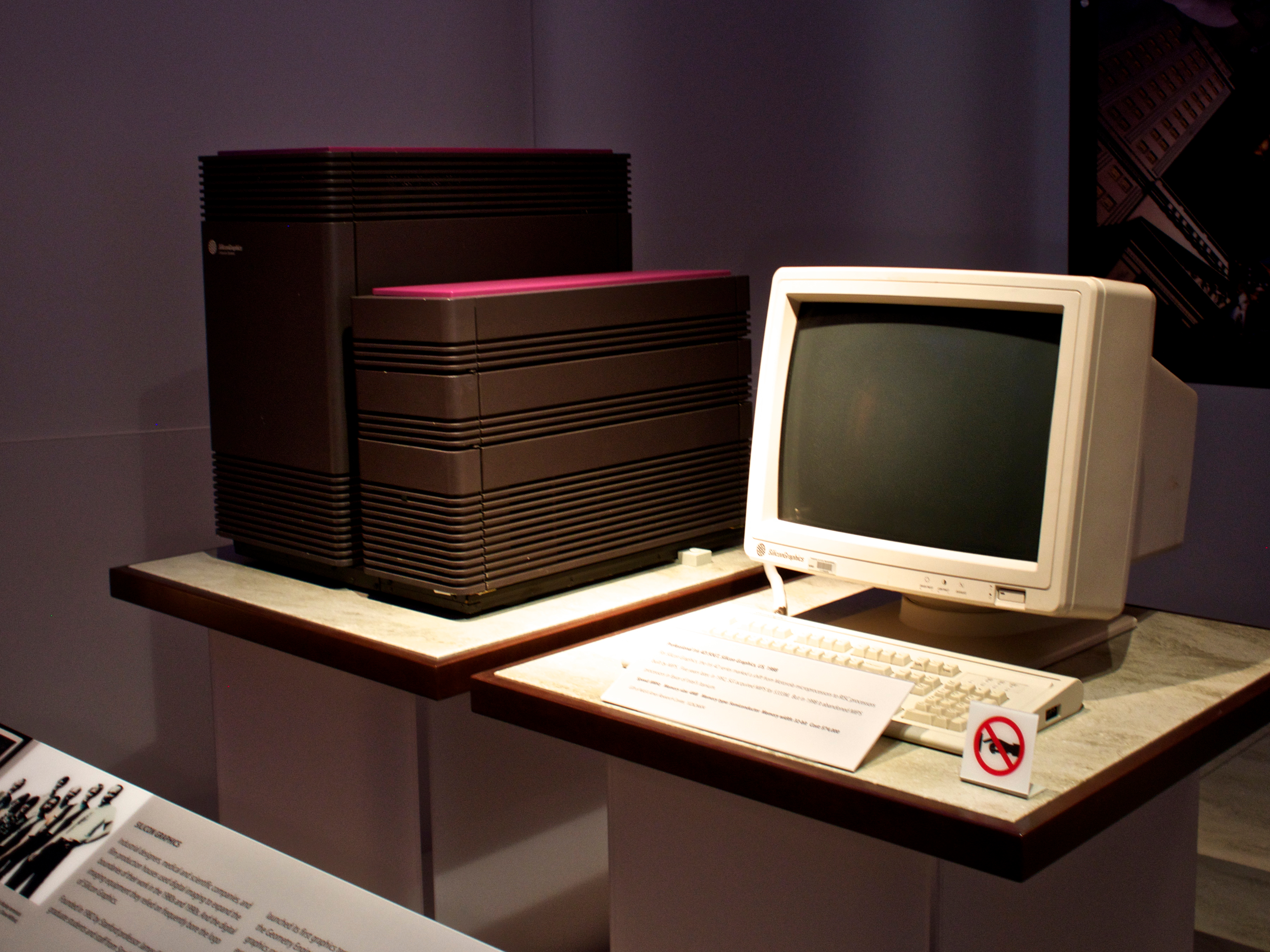
SGI Professional IRIS 4D/80

- SGI IRIS with 10-12 Geometry Engines
- SGI IrisVision AIB (add-in board, expansion card) for IBM MicroChannel bus (RS/6000)

==== 1989 ====
- ShoGraphics, a division of Atari formed after the creation of I, Robot and later spun out into a separate company, plans to release an IBM PC-compatible add-on enabling real-time Gouraud shading and texture mapping, advertised as a "very low-cost CAD system or a very high-cost game console", making it about as capable as consoles released half a decade later. Despite a showing at SIGGRAPH 1989 and promises of delivery by last quarter that year, a commercial product never materialized. ShoGraphics later manufactured CAD workstations that rivaled SGI's, with their most successful product being the PEXstation 1, released in 1992. ShoGraphics had also registered the domain shograf.com by July 1992, which was shut down by 1995 due to the discontinuation of free domain names.

=== 1990s ===
==== 1990 ====
- Intergraph EDGE-2

==== 1991 ====
- SGI Indigo Unix workstation with Elan Graphics

==== 1992 ====
- SGI releases OpenGL an API for controlling 3D hardware which is available to other hardware vendors
- Sun Graphics Tower 3D accelerator
- Intergraph GT

==== 1993 ====
- Sun SPARCstation ZX with Leo VLSI 24-bit 3D accelerator
- HP Artist
- Matrox Millennium
- Panasonic releases the FZ-1 console based on the 3DO system specification, ushering in the 3D era of fifth-generation consoles, later supplemented by the likes of the Nintendo 64 and PlayStation.

==== 1994 ====
- Matrox Impression 3D accelerator board
- VideoLogic introduces PowerVR architecture

Sony Playstation console

- PlayStation with 3D texture mapping via a Toshiba-designed GPU

== See also ==
- Computer-aided design
- Tensor core
- Tensor Processing Unit
