= Extreme Graphics =

Graphics subsystem by Silicon Graphics

- Release date: 1993; 33 years ago
- Designed by: Silicon Graphics

History
- Predecessor: Elan Graphics
- Successor: IMPACT

Support status
- Unsupported

Extreme Graphics is a computer graphics architecture for Silicon Graphics computer workstations. Extreme Graphics was developed in 1993 and was available as a high-end graphics option on workstations such as the Indigo2, released during the mid-1990s. Extreme Graphics gives the workstation real-time 2D and 3D graphics rendering capability similar to that of even high-end PCs made many years after Extreme's introduction, with the exception of texture rendering which is performed in software. Extreme Graphics systems consist of eight Geometry Engines and two Raster Engines, twice as many units as the Elan/XZ graphics used in the Indy, Indigo, and Indigo2. The eight geometry engines are rated at 256 MFLOPS maximum, far faster than the MIPS R4400 CPU used in the workstation.

Extreme Graphics consists of five graphics subsystems: the Command Engine, Geometry Subsystem, Raster Engine, framebuffer and Display Subsystem. Extreme Graphics can produce resolutions up to 1280 x 1024 pixels with 24-bit color and can also process unencoded NTSC and PAL analog television signals. It is reported by the PROM as GU1-Extreme.

The Extreme Graphics architecture was superseded by SGI's IMPACT graphics architecture in 1995.
