= SGI IRIS =

Computer terminal and workstation family

IRIS
- Developer: Silicon Graphics
- Type: Computer terminal, workstation
- Released: November 1983; 42 years ago (IRIS 1000/1200) 1984; 42 years ago (IRIS 1400); 1985; 41 years ago (IRIS 2000/2200/2300); 1986; 40 years ago (IRIS 3000); 1987; 39 years ago (Professional IRIS) October 1988; 37 years ago (Power IRIS/PowerSeries and Personal IRIS)
- Discontinued: 1992
- Operating system: IRIX
- CPU: Motorola 68000 (IRIS 1000-3000); MIPS (IRIS 4D)
- Successor: SGI Indigo; SGI Indy; SGI Indigo²

The SGI IRIS series of terminals and workstations from Silicon Graphics that was produced in the 1980s and 1990s. IRIS is an acronym for Integrated Raster Imaging System.

== Overview ==
=== 68000 ===
Silicon Graphics's first product, shipped in November 1983, was the IRIS 1000, a terminal with hardware-accelerated 3D graphics based on the Geometry Engine developed by Jim Clark and Marc Hannah at Stanford University. As a terminal, it was not intended for standalone use, and was instead attached to a VAX-11 running VAX/VMS or Unix. It was soon followed by the IRIS 1200, another terminal with a larger backplane, before the IRIS 1400 emerged as Silicon Graphics's first standalone workstation in 1984. The processor used in these early systems, the 'PM1', was a variant of the SUN (Stanford UNiversity) processor, and sported a Motorola 68000 (or 68010) clocked at 8 MHz. With the IRIS 2000 series (released in 1985) came Silicon Graphics's first inhouse processor, with a Motorola 68010 running at 10 MHz. The final Motorola 68000-based series, the 3000s released in 1986, utilized a 68020 running at 16 MHz.

These systems ran the 'IRIS Workstation Software Distribution' operating system (which was later referred to simply by the major revision of the Graphics Library, GL1 or GL2), a customized variant of UniSoft UniPlus System V Unix, which was the predecessor to the UMIPS-SysVR3-derived 4D1. Certain internal Silicon Graphics documentation referred to both GL2 and 4D1 as "IRIX", dubbing GL2 as "IRIX Version 3", and 4D1-3 as "IRIX System 5.3 version 3", though the name would only be used externally to refer to 4D1. GL2 used a proprietary (and highly rudimentary) windowing system named mex (Multiple EXposure); though Silicon Graphics's port of NeWS - referred to as '4sight' - was originally developed for the IRIS 3000 series, the port was refocused to the MIPS-based 4D/70, and only saw release with 4D1-3.

=== MIPS ===
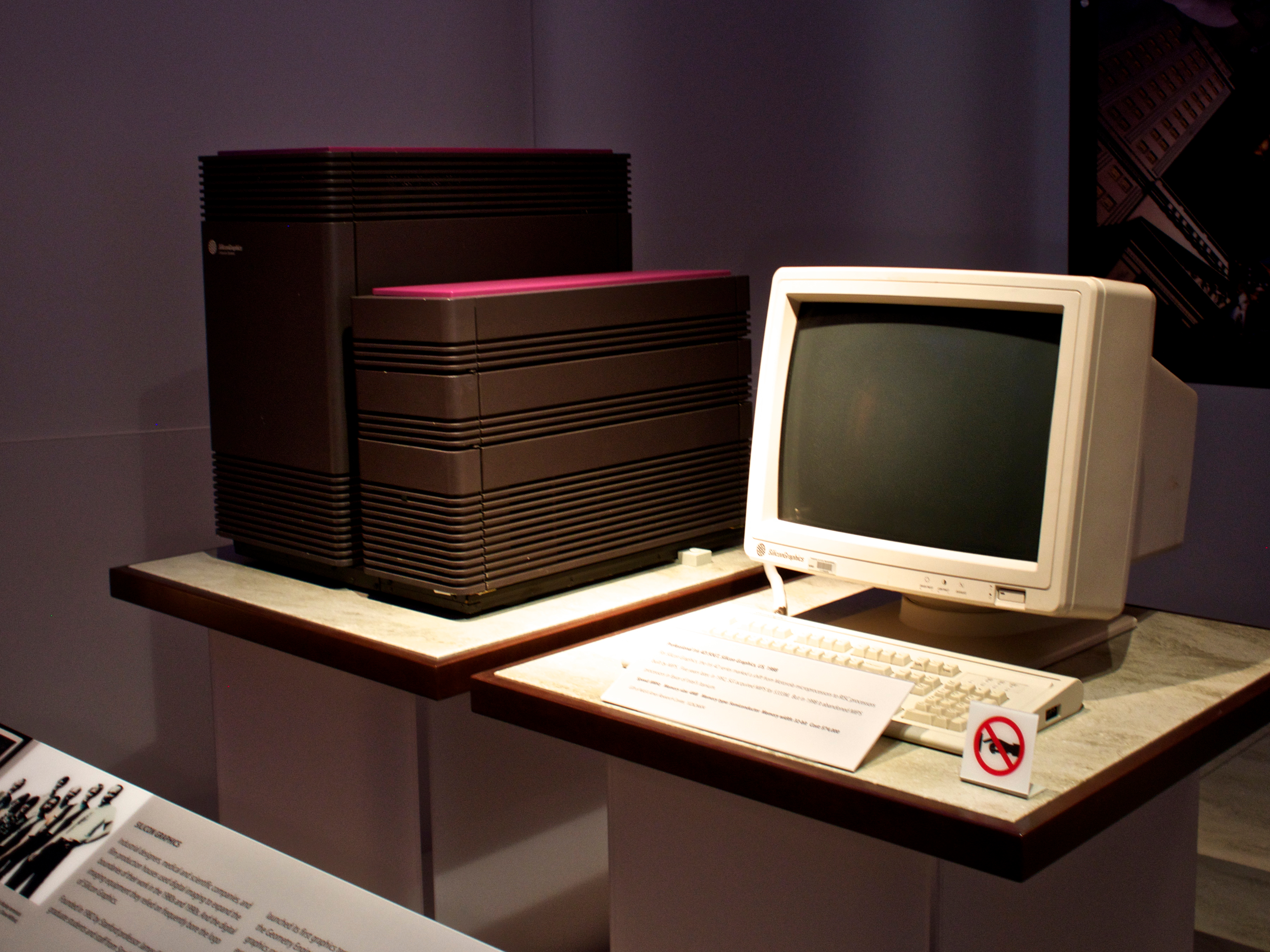
Professional IRIS 4D/80

Beginning in 1987, Silicon Graphics began selling workstations with MIPS RISC processors rather than the Motorola 680x0. These new systems adopted a different numbering scheme, with the prefix '4D/' followed by a two-to-three digit number. The first of these systems was the 4D/60 'Professional IRIS', sporting a MIPS R2300 clocked at 8 MHz in a unique 'twin-tower' enclosure, with the VME chassis being within a larger tower on the left, and the power supply and drives being kept within a smaller tower on the right. The right tower had a modular design, which permitted the addition of further drives by stacking them vertically, which increased the height of the tower. Like the IRIS 1000 series which preceded it, the 4D/60 did not use an inhouse processor board, instead using an "off-the-shelf" R2300 MIPS systems boardset (likewise, the earliest versions of the new operating system for the MIPS-based workstations, dubbed '4D1', was largely derived from MIPS' own UMIPS). The 4D/60 was only available for a short time before the 4D/70 - with a single-board inhouse processor design - was released, and with it an upgrade to convert the 4D/60's R2300 boardset to the 4D/70's processor board (known as the 'turbo' upgrade). The Professional line would grow to include the low-end 8 MHz 4D/50, midrange 12.5MHz 4D/70, and higher end 16.7 MHz 4D/80. A new graphics architecture - internally codenamed 'Clover2', but marketed as 'GT' - would be released in 1988, and offered a drastic improvement over the original 'Clover1' graphics, with support for hardware accelerated advanced shading, a hardware z-buffer, and overall improved performance.

In 1988, Silicon Graphics introduced the higher-end Power IRIS line (specializing in Symmetric Multi-Processing, and so-named for its proprietary POWERpath architecture), and the lower-end Personal IRIS line. The Professional line would be gradually phased out, with the so-called "Omni IRIS" 4D/85GT being released in 1990 to fill the gap between the Personal series at the low end and the Power series at the high end.

The Power IRIS systems (later dubbed "PowerSeries") came in a number of configurations, with anywhere between 1 and 8 processors and coming in either a twin-tower chassis akin to the Professional IRIS, a mini-fridge sized desk-side chassis (code-named 'Diehard'), or a full rack-sized chassis (code-named 'Predator'). One could determine the processor count of a Power IRIS system from its model number - the second digit would directly indicate the number of CPUs, so a 4D/210 would have one processor, a 4D/340 would have 4 processors, etc. The Power IRIS series was ultimately eclipsed, first by the 64-bit MIPS R4000-based IRIS Crimson, and then by the POWERpath-2 based Onyx and Challenge series.

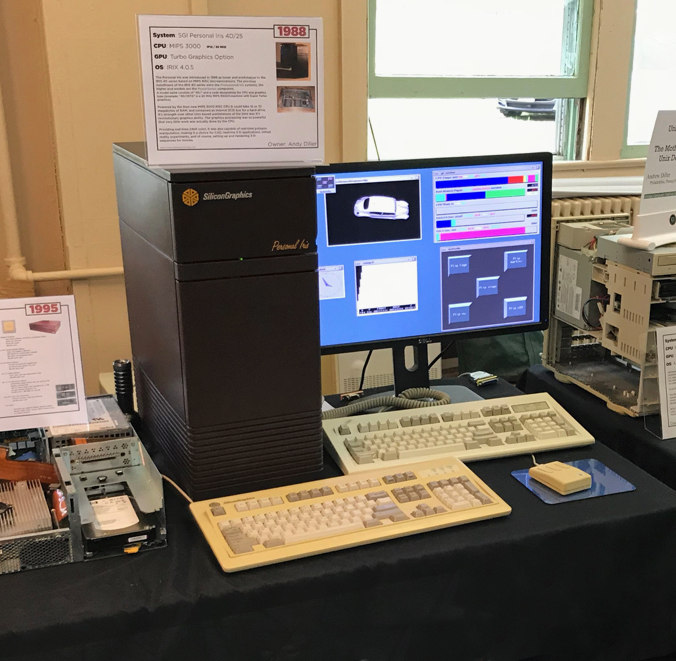
Personal IRIS 4D/25 with LCD monitor

The Personal IRIS line consisted of four main models - the 4D/20, 4D/25, 4D/30, and 4D/35. The 12.6 MHz 4D/20 was released in 1988, the 20 MHz 4D/25 in 1989, the 30 MHz 4D/30 in 1990, and the 36 MHz 4D/35 in 1991. With an entry price of £10,300, the Personal IRIS was Silicon Graphics' cheapest workstation. The 4D/35 shared much of its architectural design with the IRIS Indigo, released in 1991 - the similarities were such that, in software, both were identified with the same Inhouse Processor ID (IP12).

Beginning in late 1992 with the release of the Indigo2 and Challenge, the 'IRIS' prefix would be dropped from the names of all future systems, as well as the '4D/' model numbers. The '4D1' operating system, which from version 4D1-3 onwards was officially referred to as IRIX 4D1 (IRIX being a portmanteau of 'IRIS' and 'UNIX), would be re-branded as simply 'IRIX' beginning in version 5, as well. However, all future MIPS-based systems released by Silicon Graphics would still use 'IRIS' as the default hostname, ending with the Tezro in 2003.

=== Human Interface Devices ===
A unifying feature across all IRISes — 68K, Professional, Personal, PowerSeries, Indigo, Crimson, and Onyx — is a proprietary serial-based keyboard/mouse protocol. Earlier machines use either a DE-15 (68K, Professional, PowerSeries) or DE-9 (4D/20, /25) connector, with the later machines (4D/30, /35, Indigo, Crimson, Onyx) using a mini DIN-6 which is easy to confuse with a standard PS/2 connector. One must take care not to insert an IRIS keyboard into a PS/2 port or vice versa, as the voltage levels used in the two protocols are incompatible and may result in damage to the keyboard, computer, or both. An easy method to determine if a Silicon Graphics keyboard is PS/2 or not is to check whether or not the mouse plugs in to the keyboard — the IRIS protocol, similar to Apple's Apple Desktop Bus and Sun's own serial keyboard/mouse protocol, daisy-chains the mouse and keyboard together.

== See also ==
- Silicon Graphics Image for filename extension .iris
- IRIS GL, the predecessor of OpenGL
