= IRIS GL =

Graphics API by Silicon Graphics

- Developer: Silicon Graphics
- Stable release: n/a / 1992; 34 years ago
- Operating system: IRIX
- Type: API
- License: Various proprietary

IRIS GL (Integrated Raster Imaging System Graphics Library) is a proprietary graphics API created by Silicon Graphics (SGI) in the early 1980s for producing 2D and 3D computer graphics on their IRIX-based IRIS graphical workstations. Later SGI removed their proprietary code, reworked various system calls, and released IRIS GL as the industry standard OpenGL.

== History ==
In 1982, SGI began development of IRIS GL. It soon became much more popular than the ANSI standard PHIGS, as developers considered it more intuitive and flexible. In the years after 1982, IRIS GL began licensing it to many companies, including IBM. Fragmentation soon became an issue with IRIS GL's popularity, in the implementations and a much bigger one with many different windowing systems. In 1985, the X window system came around, and finally there was a somewhat common system. The system was considered more transparent and reliable.

Later, a competitor came along from Sun Microsystems and Digital Equipment Corporation, relying much more on the X window system. It was technically called X3D, though soon became more commonly known as PHIGS Extension To X (PEX). By the late 1980s, full implementations were available. Around that time, developers that used IRIS GL started to demand a portable, open graphics standard from SGI to support the most machines possible.

In 1989, to comply with the demands and not be replaced, SGI started development of OpenGL. Two years later, the OpenGL ARB was formed with people from many different companies. In September 1991, it was announced by SGI that IRIS GL was available for general licensing, making it fully open. They also announced that several companies, including Intel and Microsoft endorsed the GL.

In June 1992, the OpenGL 1.0 specification was released, with as much portability as possible. Unlike PEX, OpenGL did not rely on the window system, it being a completely separate part to ensure their previous goals were met. To avoid namespace conflicts, every function was prefixed with "gl". Many modules were also either cleaned up, removed, or renamed.

== Overview ==
IRIS GL was a graphics library for the IRIX workstations. Window creation and input were built in.

It provided special routines for handling 3D graphics, allowing the user to specify a 3D transformation, and then having it automatically be applied with every vertex passed in. Due to the lack of programmable shaders, shading was specified with many parameters including diffuse, specular, ambient, and emission.

There existed routines like rect that allowed a programmer to specify vertices from a more high-level perspective.

The GL also had basic typesetting support using raster fonts, and also support for NURBS curves

== See also ==
- Silicon Graphics Image for file extension .iris
- SGI IRIS
- IrisVision - first port to PCs
