= Vpro =

Vpro, vpro or VPRO may refer to:

- VPRO, a Dutch broadcasting organisation (originally Vrijzinnig Protestantse Radio Omroep)
- Intel vPro, a set of features built into computer motherboards and other hardware
- SGI VPro, a series of Silicon Graphics graphics adapters
