= SGI Indy =

1993 graphics workstation computer

Indy
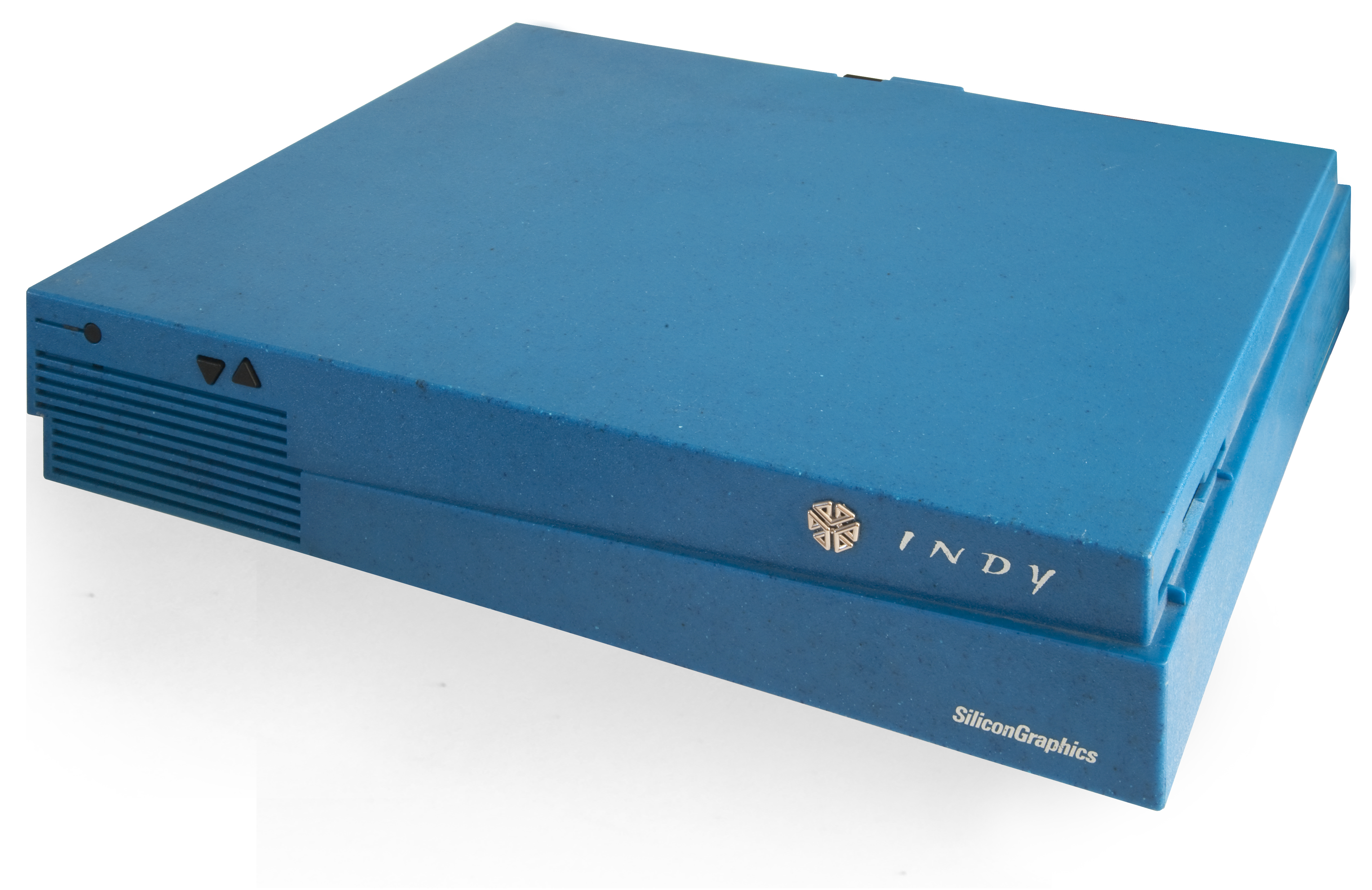
- Manufacturer: Silicon Graphics Incorporated
- Introduced: July 12, 1993; 33 years ago
- Discontinued: June 30, 1997
- Cost: $5,000–16,495
- Processor: R4000; R4400; R4600; R5000
- Frequency: 100 MHz
- Memory: 16 or 32 MB (up to 256 MB)
- Dimensions: 41 cm × 36 cm × 8 cm

The Indy, code-named "Guinness", is a low-end multimedia workstation introduced on July 12, 1993 by Silicon Graphics Incorporated (SGI). SGI developed, manufactured, and marketed Indy as the lowest end of its product line, for computer-aided design (CAD), desktop publishing, and multimedia markets. It competed with Intel x86 computers, and with Windows and Macintosh, including using their files and running their applications via software emulation. It is the first computer to come standard with a video camera, called IndyCam.

Indy was repackaged as a server model (no video and audio support) called Challenge S. Indy was discontinued on June 30, 1997, and support ended on December 31, 2011.

== Hardware ==
The Indy is one of the smaller form factors of the time (41 cm × 36 cm × 8 cm). The sturdy, electric-blue colored "pizza box" chassis is comparable to a contemporary small desktop PC, and is intended to fit underneath a large CRT monitor. Designed for multimedia use, the Indy includes analog and digital I/O, 6-channel digital audio processing, SCSI, and inputs for composite and S-Video. It has ISDN and Ethernet ports. It is the first computer to include a video camera, called IndyCam.

The base Indy model was launched in July 1993 at US$5,000 (equivalent to about $11,100 in 2025), without a hard drive, or diskless, and is intended for networked use. The model with 2 GB hard drive was launched at $7,500. The base model was launched with 16 MB of RAM and can be expanded to 256 MB. Later in 1993, that duo was updated to have the base model with a 535 MB hard drive ($5,995 in January 1994) and the high end with 24-bit color, 32 MB RAM, and 1 GB hard drive ($16,495 in January 1994). In March 1994, the series was refreshed with a new 150 MHz R4400 CPU, and the low end model has 8-bit color, 32 MB RAM, 535 MB hard drive, and 16-inch 1280 x 1024 monitor for $15,495 (equivalent to $33,700 in 2025) and the high end has 24-bit color, 64 MB RAM, 1 GB hard drive for $22,995 (equivalent to $49,900 in 2025).

Sales of low-cost high-performance workstations were projected to triple from 1994 to 1999, and competition for that market increased between Sun and SGI. In February 1995, SGI targeted "high-performance iron" at junior engineers by refreshing the Indy series with two models: the Indy Modeler PC and SC systems starting at $15,800 with a 133 MHz R4600 CPU, 1 GB hard drive, 32 MB of RAM, and 20-inch monitor. Time Warner Cable and US West created an experimental interactive video-on-demand service via cable television, based on Indy.

The optional floptical drive uses 21 MB disks and standard 3.5" magnetic floppy disks.

=== CPU ===
Indy's motherboard has a socket for the Processor Module (PM). Indy was launched with a 100 MHz MIPS R4000PC microprocessor upgrade option. The Indy, at the bottom of SGI's price list, was then upgraded with the MIPS R4400 and the low-cost, low-power-consumption Quantum Effect Devices (QED) R4600. The R4600 has higher integer performance, but lesser floating-point capability. The R4600 appears outside the Indy line briefly once, in the SGI Indigo². A number of limits, such as the series of microprocessor issues, the relatively low-powered graphics boards, lower maximum RAM amount, and relative lack of internal expansion ability compared to the SGI Indigo, led to the Indy being pejoratively described by industry insiders as "An Indigo without the 'go'."

As the R4600 chip itself has no L2 cache controller, an external controller is used to add 512K of L2 cache. R4600s processor modules, both with an L2 cache (SC) and without (PC), have been produced for the Indy. At the same clock rate, the SC version of the processor module is generally 20 to 40 percent faster than the PC version, due to the memory cache.

The Indy is the first SGI machine to utilize the QED R5000 microprocessor, which offers significant advantages over the R4400 and R4600 it replaced.

The performance of the 100 MHz R4000 in conjunction with 500 KB of secondary cache, this cache not being provided on the base model, was described as broadly comparable to Intel's 66 MHz Pentium, at least in terms of published benchmark results, although that particular version of the Pentium was "still a few months off" at the time of early reviews of the machine. Indy was reportedly seen by SGI as a rival to high-end Macs in the graphics rendering market, with claims of "40 times the performance of a machine with a 68030".

=== Graphics ===
Three graphics subsystems have been produced for the Indy: 8-bit XL, 24-bit XL, and 24-bit XZ. Each support a maximum resolution of 1280 × 1024 pixels at a refresh rate of 76 Hz, and have a 13W3 monitor connection. Graphics options are connected to the system using a GIO32bis bus.

==== 8-bit XL ====
Also known as "Newport" graphics and based on the REX3 chipset, these were designed for general 2D X11 applications; no hardware 3D acceleration is included. This is the first accelerator to demonstrate object-based antialiasing and exact sub-pixel lines using Bresenham's line algorithm.

==== 24-bit XL (XGE) ====
Using a circuit board identical to that of the 8-bit XL, the 24-bit XL includes three times as much framebuffer memory to accommodate 24-bit color.

In an Indy with an R5000 CPU, these graphics options are called XGE, because an R5000 CPU can perform 3D geometry calculations faster than the XZ subsystems's four Geometry Engines. As a result, all 3D is done in software. The situation is, however, reversed when the calculations are done for full-screen rendering and involve z-buffer operations (which XL does not possess). XZ graphics are rarely paired with the R5000 for this reason.

==== XZ ====
This graphics option is a conversion of the Indigo²'s XZ (Elan) graphics into Indy. They offer very good non-textured 3D performance for the time, sacrificing a bit of 2D performance in return. The XZ graphics option has not been popular in Indy models that used the R5000 microprocessor. This is mostly due to the R5000's MIPS IV architecture, which enhanced MIPS' floating-point arithmetic capabilities, allowing coordinate transformations to be performed faster than the XZ graphics board. However, using XZ to perform coordinate transforms does free the CPU to perform other rendering-related calculations. If the application is not transform-limited (limited by the speed of coordinate transformation), then the XZ option can provide significant rasterization performance advantages over the XL boards.

These graphics take the form of two boards, vertically layered, and block both GIO option slots, making them less favorable because options such as 10/100 Ethernet and JPEG compression boards cannot be installed.

=== Video ===
The Indy is the first computer to have a standard video camera, and the first SGI computer to have standard video inputs. Each Indy has an amateur quality composite, S-Video, and digital video input built into the motherboard, which collectively are known as "Vino" (video input, no output) video. The digital input is a SGI Digital Video Interface (proprietary D-sub connector) with a rectangular high density array of 60 pins, and is used by the IndyCam. The connector incorporates two digital video ports, but only uses the first one for input on the Indy. The protocol is similar to the CCIR 601 Parallel Video interface.

The maximum supported input resolution is 640×480 for NTSC or 768×576 for PAL. A fast machine is required to capture at either of these resolutions, though; an Indy with slower R4600PC CPU, for example, may require the input resolution to be reduced before storage or processing. However, the Vino hardware is capable of DMAing video fields directly into the framebuffer with minimal CPU overhead.

The IndyCam is a small fixed-focus digital video camera, co-developed by SGI and Teleview Research. It can be mounted above the monitor, or hand-held. It is one of the first desktop video cameras and the first to come standard on a computer. With the bundled software, it can be used for video conferencing, video editing, or video email.

None of the Indy models support a video output by default, and that would require the Indy Video GIO32 card. An optional CosmoCompress module offers real-time JPEG video compression and decompression and uses another GIO32 slot.

=== Storage ===
The Indy has two drive bays for 1-inch tall 3.5" drives. The upper drive bay is externally accessible and may hold a SCSI floptical drive. All external and internal drives share a single Fast SCSI bus (unless a GIO32 SCSI card has been installed).

External CD-ROM drives connect via SCSI connector at the rear side of the box. The typical drive supports boot, OS install, audio. A special ROM is required to boot from for certain device types. A small number of CD-ROM drives have the firmware needed to do audio over SCSI.

=== Networking ===
All Indy models shipped with AUI/10BASE-T Ethernet and ISDN as standard equipment. The Ethernet ports are half-duplex only. The 10BASE-T port takes precedence over the AUI port; if the system detects a carrier on both ports, it will use the 10BASE-T.

Two different manufacturers produced 100BASE-TX Ethernet cards compatible with the Indy, both of which attached to the system using the GIO32 bus. Set Engineering produced one such fast Ethernet card, based on the Texas Instruments ThunderLAN chipset, under contract with SGI. Phobos also produced models of fast Ethernet cards for the Indy (the G100 and G130).

The ISDN port provided on the Indy has no NT1. An external NT1 is required to use the ISDN port in North America.

== Software ==
Indy was launched with the IRIX 5.1 operating system, by which it is binary-compatible across the entire SGI family. 5.1 does not take full advantage of the hardware due to inadequate memory management. Later in 1993, SGI increased the base specification to 32 MB. IRIX 5.2 and later have much more efficient memory usage. The latest release of IRIX available for the Indy workstations is 6.5.22. Indy includes a CD of video games.

Indy competed with Windows and Macintosh, including using their files and running their applications via software emulation. One commentator remarked that using Quorum's Latitude technology, "Indy blows Macs away using the Mac's own software", also expressing similar sentiments about Windows support provided by SoftPC. AutoCAD Designer was priced at $1,500 (equivalent to $3,300 in 2025) to target the affordable CAD market, including Indy.

== Challenge S ==
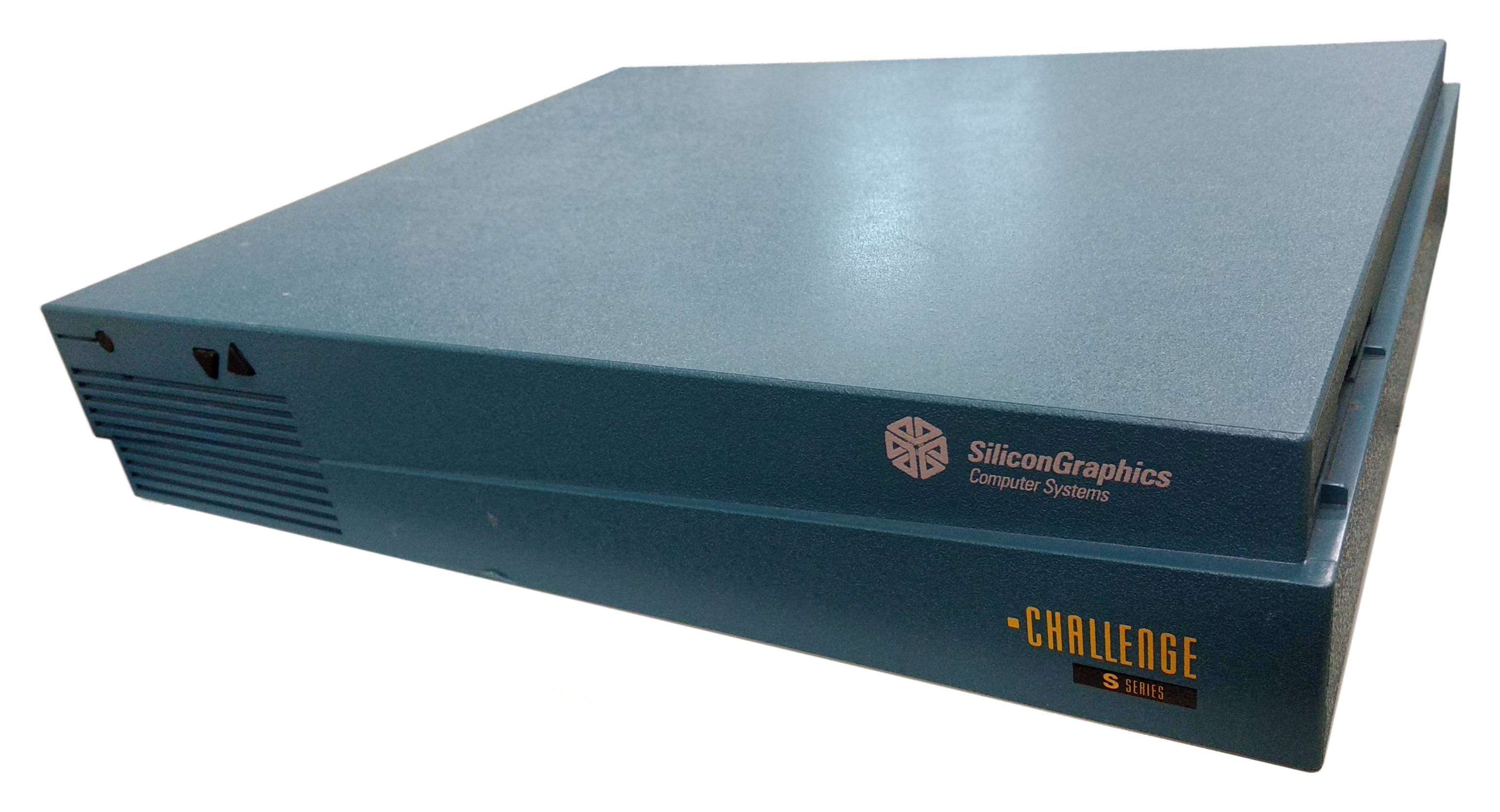
Challenge S

The Challenge S is a variant of the Indy for low-end server usage. It has an identical case as the Indy except for the name badge, with a nearly identical motherboard, but without any graphics or sound hardware. Vestigial volume control buttons on the front are not connected to anything. The Challenge S comes with an ISDN port and a 10 Mbit/s AUI Ethernet port. All local administration is performed by serial console to one of the two DIN-8 serial ports, which can be used to reach the PROM prompt and uses the same pin-out found on Macintosh serial ports.

== Reception ==
At launch, SGI said it expected to sell $1 billion worth of Indy units.

Electronic Design reviewed the Indy at launch in July 1993, saying that the IndyCam and video input marked a new standard for workstations. Jonathan Chevreau of the National Post wrote several articles at Indy's launch, making a headline out of the standardization of a video camera on a personal computer, speculating this could mark the convergence of consumer electronics with the computer industry. On August 21, 1993, he said the Indy was "one of the most interesting new products in the personal computer industry" as SGI's first price breakthrough for individuals. He said Indy's video power and Indigo Magic Desktop GUI make it "much more than a personal computer", with a sophistication that "clone companies will be slow in imitating". He summarized, "Anyone interested in the booming new field of multimedia and the convergence of personal computers with consumer electronics and telecommunications would be smitten by a serious case of techno-lust by the Indy." He said the Indy positioned SGI at the forefront of the birth of the major industry of desktop multimedia, as the best recent multimedia computer next to the Macintosh Quadra 840AV and Centris 660AV. Machine Design magazine called Indy "the only computer to come standard with a color digital video camera, IndyCam". Mechanical Engineering magazine said "the most unique feature of the Indy system is its integrated digital media capabilities", such as IndyCam, video input port, and applications for video conferencing and multimedia creation. Byte magazine said in September 1993 that Apple and SGI were trailblazers by setting audio and video as default features of the Macintosh and Indy desktop PCs, which "could change the way businesspeople communicate". In 1994, Byte called the new Indy "low on price but high on graphics performance", noting its interoperability with Windows and Macintosh.
