= SGI Indigo =

Workstations family by Silicon Graphics

Silicon Graphics Indigo
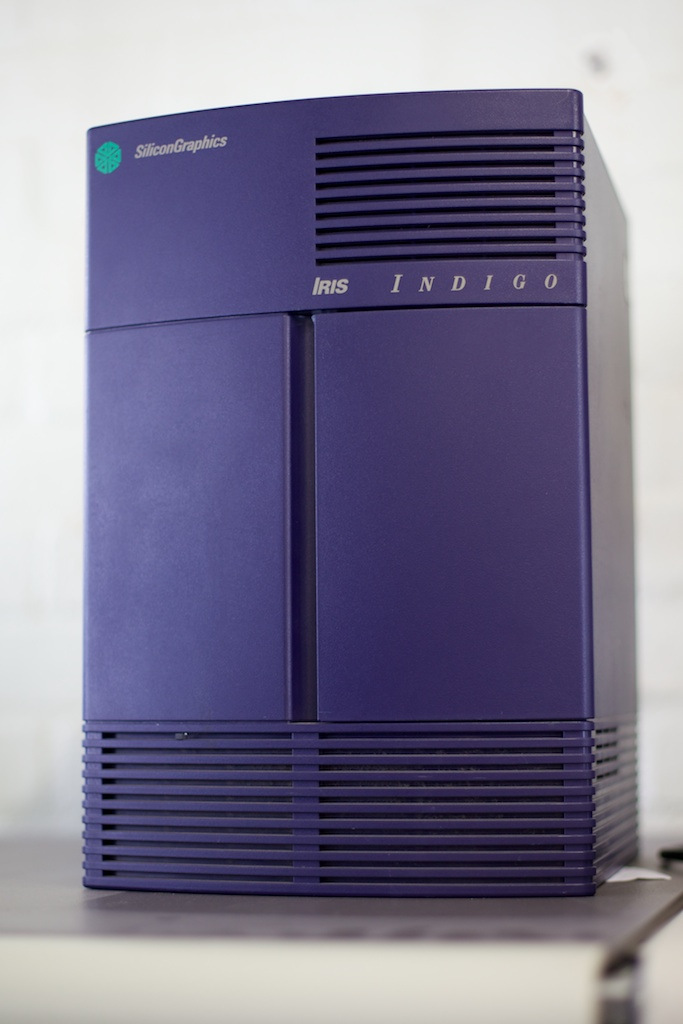
- Also known as: SGI IRIS Indigo
- Developer: SGI
- Type: 3D Graphics workstation
- Released: 1991
- Discontinued: 1995
- Predecessor: SGI IRIS 4D
- Successor: SGI Indigo2; SGI Crimson

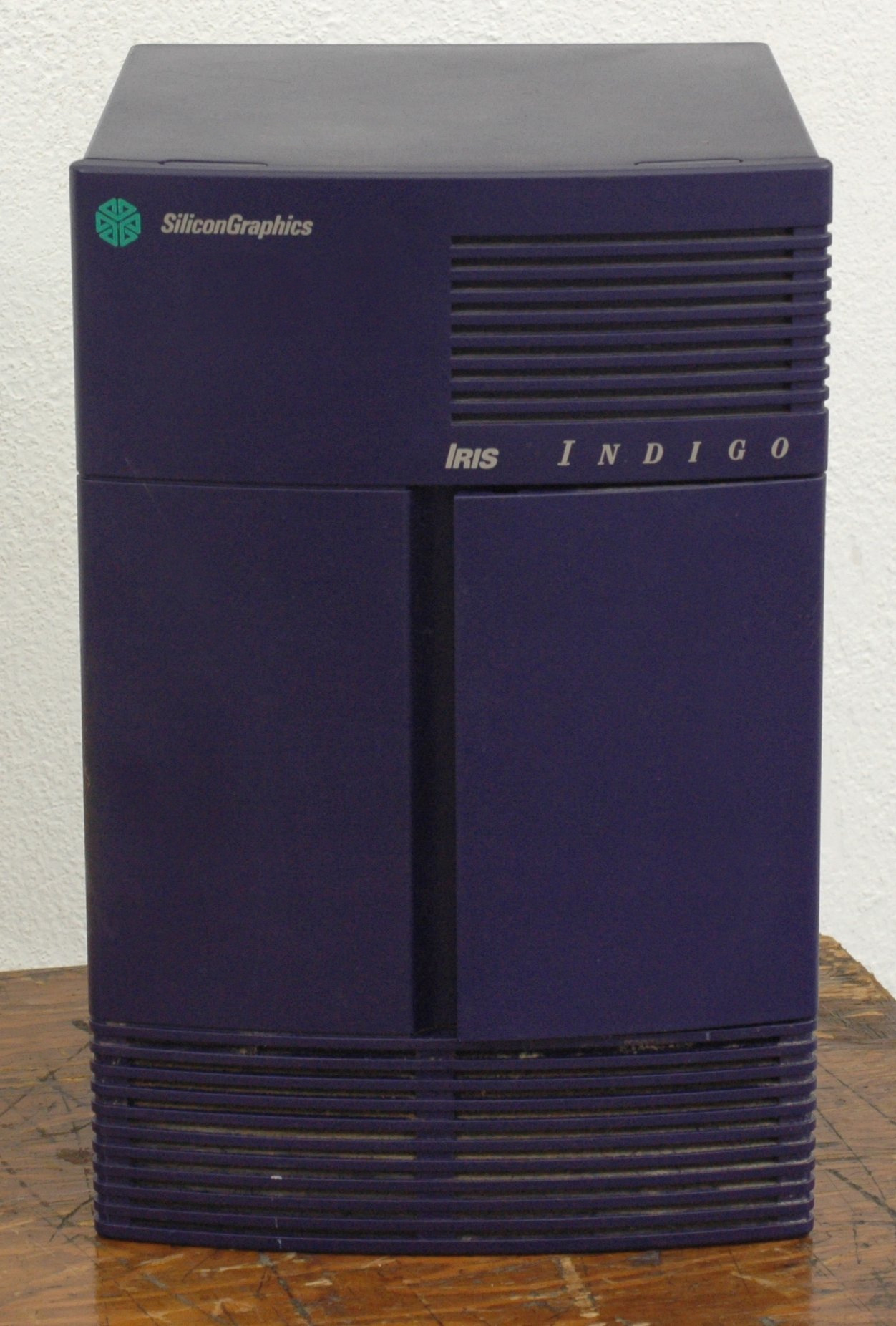
SGI Indigo, front

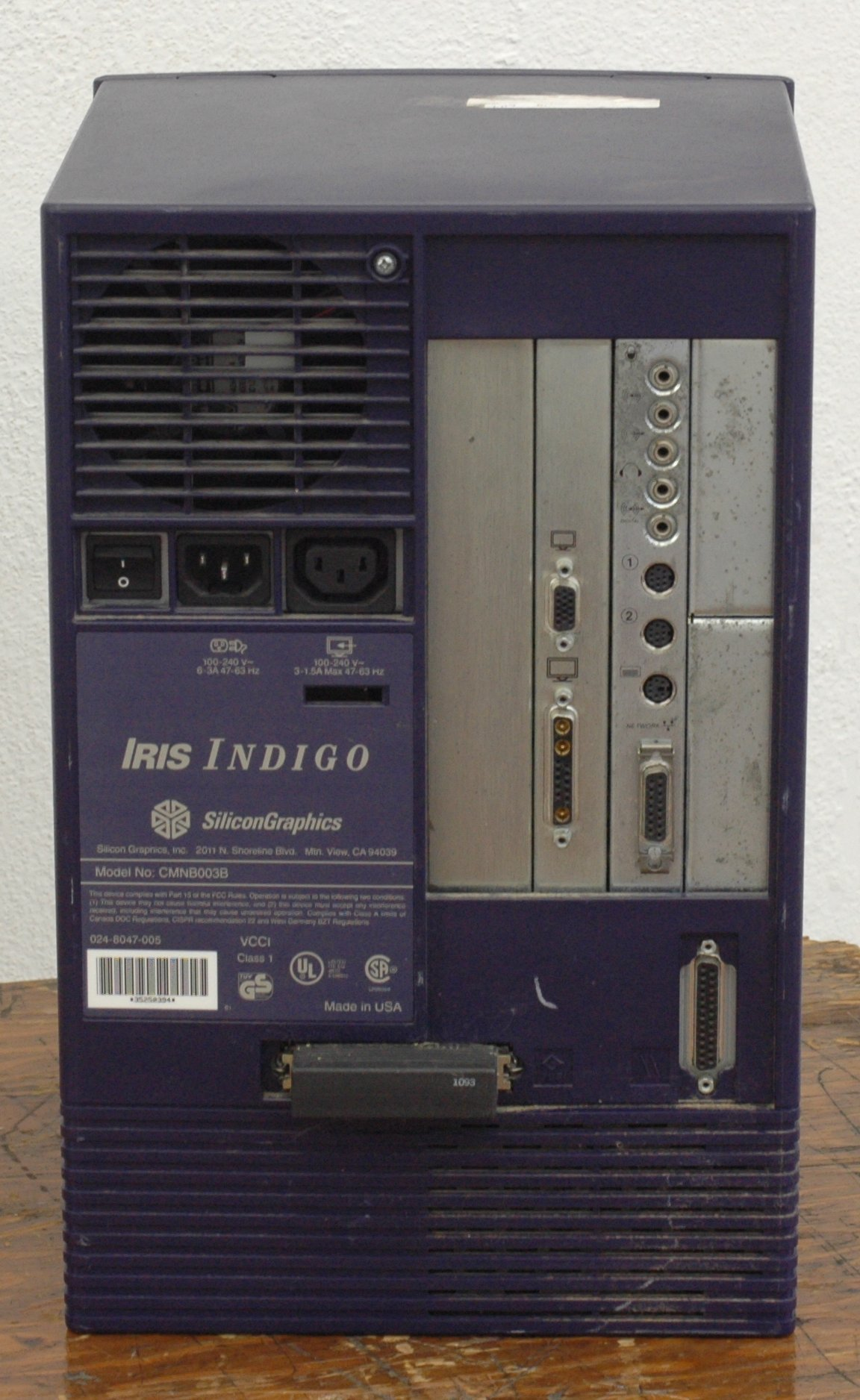
SGI Indigo, back

The Indigo, introduced as the IRIS Indigo, is a line of workstation computers developed and manufactured by Silicon Graphics, Inc. (SGI). SGI first announced the system in July 1991.

The Indigo is one of the most capable graphics workstations of its era, and was essentially peerless in the realm of hardware-accelerated three-dimensional graphics rendering. For use as a graphics workstation, the Indigo was equipped with a two-dimensional framebuffer or, for use as a 3D graphics workstation, with the Elan graphics subsystem including one to four Geometry Engines (GEs). SGI sold a server version with no video adapter.

The Indigo's design is based on a simple cube motif in indigo hue. Graphics and other peripheral expansions are accomplished via the GIO32 expansion bus.

The Indigo was superseded generally by the SGI Indigo2, and in the low-cost market segment by the SGI Indy.

== Technical specifications ==
The first Indigo model (code-named Hollywood) was introduced on July 22, 1991. It is based on the IP12 processor board, which contains a 32-bit MIPS R3000A microprocessor soldered on the board and proprietary memory slots supporting up to 96 MB of RAM.

The later version (code-named Blackjack) was introduced in July 1992, priced from $12,485, utilising a 64-bit MIPS R4000SC processor clocked externally at 50 MHz. The model is based on the IP20 processor board, which has a removable processor module (PM1 or PM2) containing a R4000 (100 MHz) or R4400 processor (100 MHz or 150 MHz) that implements the MIPS-III instruction set. The IP20 uses standard 72-pin SIMMs with parity, and has 12 SIMM slots for a total of 384 MB of RAM at maximum.

A Motorola 56000 DSP is used for Audio IO, giving it 4-channel 16-bit audio. Ethernet is supported on board by the SEEQ 80C03 chipset coupled with the HPC (High-performance Peripheral Controller), which provides the DMA engine. The HPC interfaces primarily between the GIO bus and the Ethernet, SCSI (WD33C93 chipset) and the 56000 DSP. The GIO bus interface is implemented by the PIC (Processor Interface Controller) on IP12 and MC (Memory Controller) on IP20.

Much of the hardware design can be traced back to the SGI IRIS 4D/3x series, which shared the same memory controller, Ethernet, SCSI, and optionally DSP as the IP12 Indigo. The 4D/30, 4D/35 and Indigo R3000 are all considered IP12 machines and run the same IRIX kernel. The Indigo R3000 is effectively a reduced cost 4D/35 without a VME bus. The PIC supports a VME expansion bus (used on the 4D/3x series) and GIO expansion slots (used on the Indigo). In all IP12, IP20, and IP22/IP24 (see SGI Indigo2) systems the HPC attached to the GIO bus.

== Graphics options ==
=== Entry graphics ===
For entry graphics, the 8-bit color frame buffer comes in three versions. One version uses the system's GIO expansion bus. Another uses the main backplane like the XS, XZ, and Elan graphics options. The final is the same, but adds a second video output, giving the computer the ability to have two "heads", or monitors.

=== XS Graphics ===
The Indigo's XS Graphics option has a single GE7 Geometry Engine (GE), a RE3 Raster engine, a HQ2 Command engine, VC1, XMAP5. It is ideal for low-cost wireframe operations, compared to more powerful, and expensive options for textured graphics. Part of SGI's Express line of graphics, four XS graphics options were produced for the Indigo: the XS-8 offers 8-bit color, with one VM2 video RAM module; the XS-Z adds the ZB-4 Z buffer; the XS-24 adds two VM2 modules and offers 24 color bits and 32 bits including brightness; and the XS-24Z adds a Z buffer.

=== XZ Graphics ===
The XZ graphics option is also a member of SGI's Express graphics line. It is similar to the XS-24z, but it includes a second GE7 Geometry Engine ASIC, doubling its geometry performance.

=== Elan Graphics ===
The highest performance graphics option offered for the Indigo, it is a member of SGI's Express graphics line. It is like the XS-24z and XZ, but has 4 GE7 Geometry Engine ASICs, giving it twice the performance of the XZ option.

== Operating system ==
The Indigo was designed to run IRIX, SGI's version of Unix. The Indigos with R3000 processors are supported up to IRIX version 5.3, and Indigo equipped with an R4000 or R4400 processor can run up to IRIX 6.5.22.

Additionally, the free Unix-like operating system NetBSD has support for both the IP12 and IP20 Indigos as part of the sgimips port.

== Popular culture ==
The Indigo was featured in Jurassic Park as the rendering system for Samuel L. Jackson's character Arnold and his station to render graphics for Park Control Systems. It was paired to a Macintosh Quadra 700.

Preceded by SGI IRIS 4D Personal	SGI IRIS 4D Personal	Succeeded by SGI Indy
Preceded by SGI IRIS 4D Personal	SGI IRIS Indigo; 1991 - 1995	Succeeded by SGI Indy
Preceded by SGI IRIS 4D Professional	SGI IRIS Indigo; 1991 - 1995	Succeeded by SGI Indigo2
