= SGI Crimson =

Workstation computer

Silicon Graphics Crimson
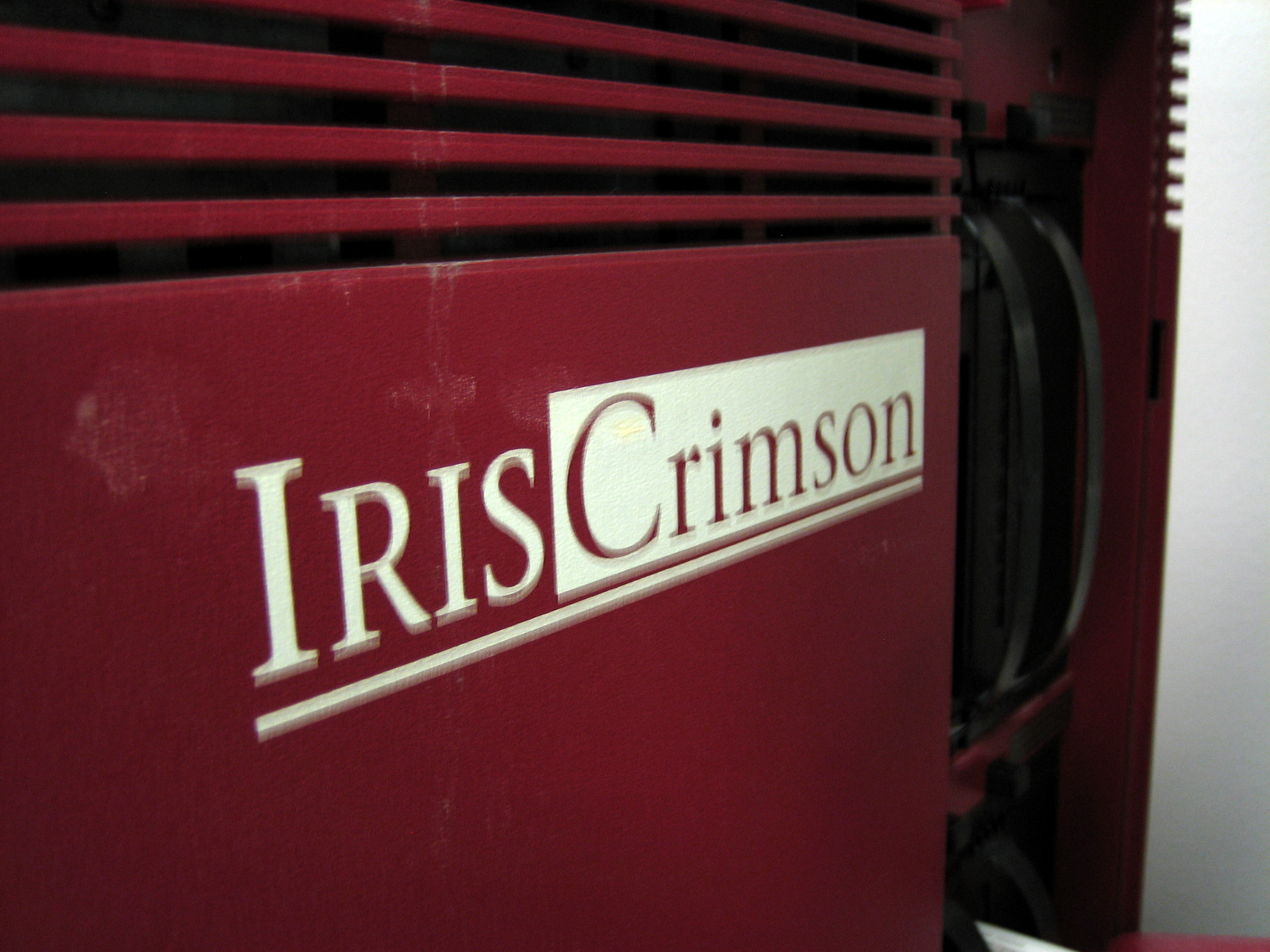
- Also known as: SGI IRIS 4D Crimson
- Developer: SGI
- Type: 3D Graphics workstation
- Released: 1992
- Discontinued: 1997
- CPU: MIPS R4000, MIPS R4400
- Predecessor: SGI IRIS 4D POWER series
- Successor: SGI Onyx

The IRIS Crimson (code-named Diehard2) is a Silicon Graphics (SGI) computer released in 1992. It was SGI's first 64-bit product released to market, as well as one of the earliest 64-bit workstation and UNIX servers available.

The Crimson is a member of Silicon Graphics's SGI IRIS 4D series of deskside systems; it is also known as the 4D/510 workstation. It is similar to the Power Series workstations, sharing the same deskside chassis. It can use a wide range of graphics options (up to RealityEngine). It was also available special order as a file server with no graphics.

This machine makes a brief appearance in the movie Jurassic Park (1993) where Lex uses the machine to navigate the IRIX filesystem in 3D using the application fsn to restore power to the compound. The next year, Silicon Graphics released a rebadged, limited-edition Crimson R4400/VGXT called the Jurassic Classic, with a special logo and SGI co-founder James H. Clark's signature on the drive door.

== Features ==
- One MIPS 100 MHz R4000 or 150 MHz R4400 processor
- Choice of seven high-performance 3D graphics subsystems (Entry, XS, XS24, Elan, Extreme, Reality Engine, VGXT)
- Up to 256 MB memory and internal disk capacity of up to 7.2 GB, expandable to more than 72 GB using additional enclosures
- I/O subsystem includes four VMEbus expansion slots, Ethernet and two SCSI channels with disk striping support

Crimson memory is unique to this model.

Preceded by SGI IRIS 4D Power Series	SGI IRIS 4D Crimson; 1992–1997	Succeeded by SGI Onyx
