= Elan Graphics =

Graphics subsystem by Silicon Graphics

- Release date: 1991; 35 years ago
- Designed by: Silicon Graphics

History
- Successor: Extreme Graphics

Support status
- Unsupported

Elan Graphics is a computer graphics architecture for Silicon Graphics computer workstations. Elan Graphics was developed in 1991 and was available as a high-end graphics option on workstations released during the mid-1990s as part of the Express Graphics architectures family. Elan Graphics gives the workstation real-time 2D and 3D graphics rendering capability similar to that of even high-end PCs made over ten years after Elan's introduction, with the exception of texture mapping, which had to be performed in software.

The Silicon Graphics Indigo Elan option Graphics systems consist of four GE7 Geometry Engines capable of a combined 128 MFLOPS and one RE3 Raster Engine. Together, they are capable of rendering 180K Z-buffered, lit, Gouraud-shaded triangles per second. The framebuffer has 56 bits per pixel, causing 12-bits per pixel (dithered RGB 4/4/4) to be used for a double-buffered, depth buffered, RGB layout. When double-buffering isn't required, it is possible to run in full 24-bit color. Similarly, when Z-buffering is not required, a double-buffered 24-bit RGB framebuffer configuration is possible. The Elan Graphics system also implemented hardware stencil buffering by allocating 4 bits from the Z-buffer to produce a combined 20-bit Z, 4-bit stencil buffer.

Elan Graphics consists of five graphics subsystems: the HQ2 Command Engine, GE7 Geometry Subsystem, RE3 Raster Engine, VM2 framebuffer and VC1 Display Subsystem. Elan Graphics can produce resolutions up to 1280 x 1024 pixels with 24-bit color and can also process unencoded NTSC and PAL analog television signals. The Elan Graphics system is made up of five daughterboards that plug into the main workstation motherboard.

The Elan Graphics architecture was superseded by SGI's Extreme Graphics architecture on Indigo2 models and eventually by the IMPACT graphics architecture in 1995.

== Features ==
- Subpixel positioning
- Advanced lighting models:
- Multiple colored light sources (up to 8)
- Ambient, diffuse, and specular lighting models
- Phong lighting
- Spotlights
- Local and infinite light source positioning
- Two-sided lighting
- Anti-aliased lines and points
- Full scene anti-aliasing
- Atmospheric effects
- Sphere rendering
- Pixel-blending capabilities for transparency effects
- Soft shadows and depth-of-field
- Texture-mapping
- Multimode windowing environment
- X11 drawing primitives and pixel move operations
- Non-Uniform Rational B-Spline (NURBS) surfaces
