= SGI Octane =

Computer series

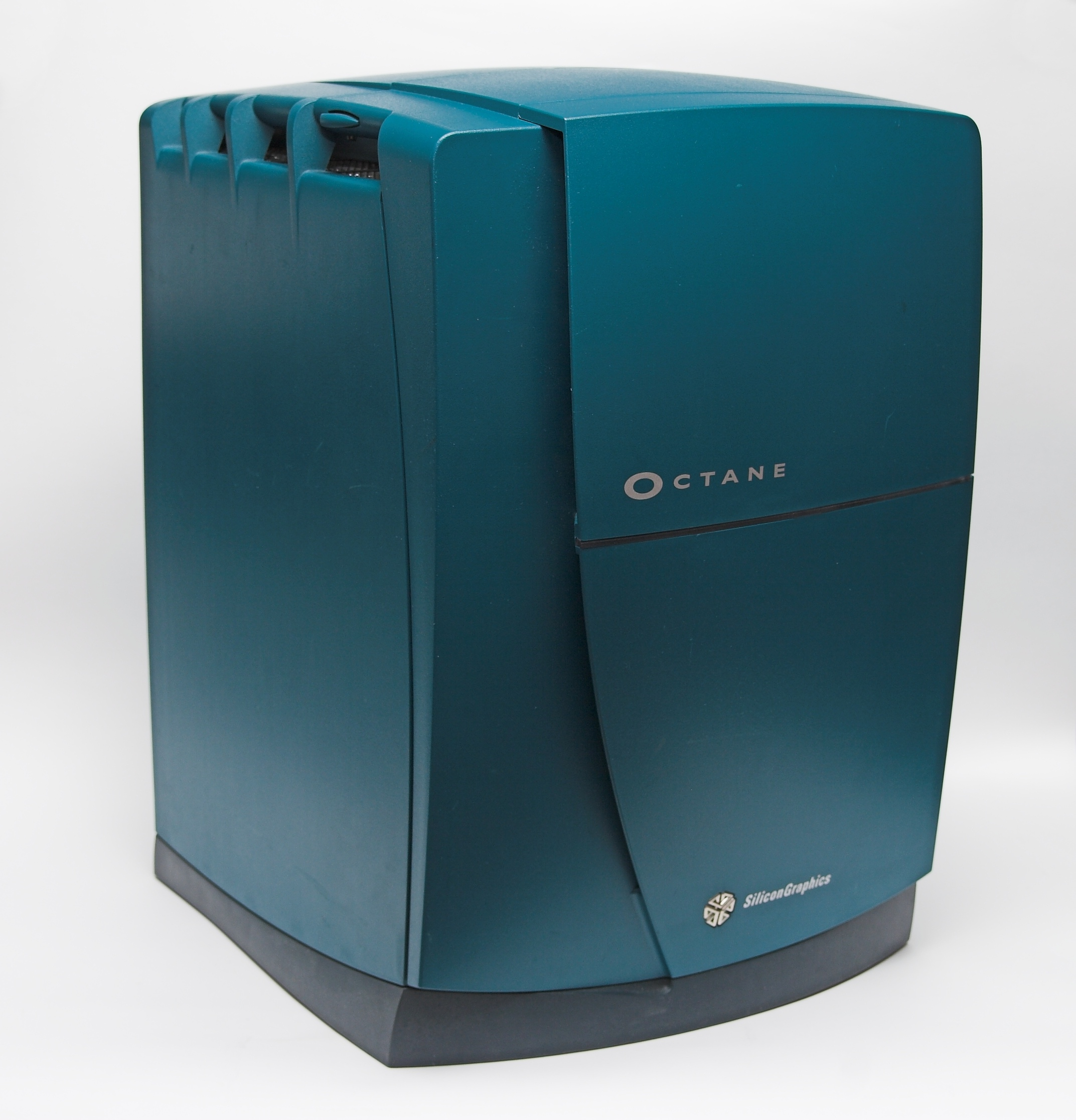
- Octane (1997-2000)
- Manufacturer: Silicon Graphics, Inc.
- Released: 1997; 29 years ago
- Discontinued: 2004
- Operating system: IRIX
- CPU: MIPS architecture
- Memory: 64 MB – 8 GB
- Weight: 25 kg (55 lb)
- Predecessor: SGI Indigo2
- Successor: SGI Tezro
- Website: sgi.com at the Wayback Machine (archived 2009-06-21)

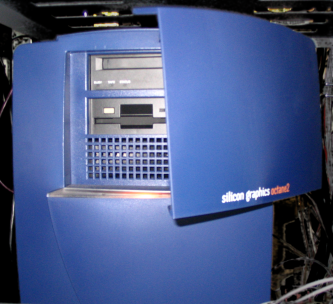
Octane2 (2000-2004)

The Octane series of IRIX workstations was developed and sold by SGI in the 1990s and 2000s. Octane and Octane2 are two-way multiprocessing-capable workstations, originally based on the MIPS Technologies R10000 microprocessor. Newer Octanes are based on the R12000 and R14000. The Octane2 has three improvements: a revised power supply, system board, and Xbow ASIC. The Octane2 has VPro graphics and supports all the VPro cards. Later revisions of the Octane include some of the improvements introduced in the Octane2. The codenames for the Octane and Octane2 are "Racer" and "Speedracer" respectively.

The Octane is the direct successor to the Indigo2, was succeeded by the Tezro, and its immediate sibling is the O2. SGI withdrew the Octane2 from the price book on May 26, 2004, and ceased Octane2 production on June 25, 2004. Support for the Octane2 ceased in June 2009.

Octane III was introduced in early 2010 after SGI's bankruptcy reorganization. It is a series of Intel-based deskside systems, as a Xeon-based workstation with one or two 3U EATX trays, or as cluster servers with 10 system trays configured with up to 10 Twin Blade nodes or 20 Intel Atom Mini-ITX nodes.

== Hardware ==
The Octane's system board is designated as IP30, based on SGI's Xtalk architecture. Xtalk does not use a system bus, but a Crossbow application-specific integrated circuit (ASIC), referred to as Xbow, a dynamic crossbar switch that connects the XIO ports to the hub. One of the ports is used for the processor and memory subsystem, one is available for PCI-X expansion, and four are XIO slots (packet-based high-bandwidth bus, somewhat similar to HyperTransport). This makes it very similar to a single node of the Origin 200 system.

The XIO can be bridged to PCI-X, using a chip named BRIDGE. This bridging includes the system board (for the IOC3 multi-I/O chip, two ISP1040B SCSI controllers and RAD1 audio), MENET cards (four IOC3s) and the PCI cage (used for PCI cards in Octane). The Octane uses ARCS boot firmware, like all contemporary SGI computer systems.

=== CPUs ===
Processors for Octane series computers:

Processor:	Cache:	Single (MHz):	Dual (MHz):
R10000SC	1 MB	175, 195, 225, 250	175, 195, 225, 250
R12000SC	2 MB	270, 300, 400	270, 300, 400
R12000SCA	2 MB	360, 400	360, 400
R14000SCA	2 MB	550, 600	550, 600

The Octane series has single and dual CPU modules. A second CPU cannot be added; the only option is to replace the whole CPU module.

=== Memory ===
The Octane supports 64 MB to 8 GB of system memory, using up to eight proprietary 200-pin DIMMs. There are two system board revisions. The first revision (part number 030-0887-003) supports 2 GB of RAM, while the second (part number 030-1467-001) allows up to 8 GB. The memory subsystem has vast reserves of bandwidth that can be directly served by the Xbow router to any XIO card.

The Octane's memory controller was named HEART. It acts as a bridge between the processor, the memory (SDRAM) and the XIO bus.

=== Graphics ===
Graphics on the Octane are provided by a series of cards: SI, SI+T, SSI, MXI. These are updated XIO versions of Solid Impact (SI), High Impact (SI+T) and Maximum Impact (MXI) from the SGI Indigo2 that were internally designated as 'MARDIGRAS'. The boards were accelerated and reengineered with faster geometry engine and texture modules to create their new versions: SE, SE+T, SSE, MXE. The SI/SE provides 13.5 MB of framebuffer memory and the SSE and MXE have a 27 MB framebuffer.

The '+T' indicates an additional high speed RDRAM-based texture board which gives 4 MB of texture memory. The SI/SE+T has one texture board, while the MXI/MXE has two texture boards; however, the two boards in the MXI/MXE do not double the available texture memory. It instead doubles the texture performance.

Later Octanes and Octane2's support the SGI VPro graphics board series, designated 'ODYSSEY'. The first VPro series cards were the V6 and V8. The main differentiator being that the V6 has 32 MB of RAM (unlike the MARDIGRAS option, framebuffer memory and texture memory come from the same pool) and V8 having 128 MB. Later, the V10 (32 MB) and V12 (128 MB) were introduced. The main difference with the new VPro V10/V12 series is that they had double the geometry performance of the older V6/V8. V6 and V10 can have up to 8 MB RAM allocated to textures (2X more than the textured-enabled MARDIGRAS options), while V8 and V12 can have up to 104 MB RAM used for textures.

The VPro graphics subsystem consists of an SGI proprietary chip set and associated software. The chip set consists of the buzz ASIC, pixel blaster and jammer (PB&J) ASIC, and associated SDRAM.

The buzz ASIC is a single-chip graphics pipeline. It operates at 251 MHz and contains on-chip SRAM. The buzz ASIC has three interfaces:

- Host (16-bit, 400-MHz peer-to-peer XIO link)
- SDRAM (The SDRAM is 32 MB (V6 or V10) or 128 MB (V8 or V12); the memory bus operates at half the speed of the buzz ASIC.)
- PB&J ASIC

As with the MARDIGRAS boards, all VPro boards support the OpenGL (MARDIGRAS is OpenGL 1.1 + SGI Extensions, and VPro upgraded support to OpenGL 1.2) and OpenGL ARB imaging extensions, allowing for hardware acceleration of numerous imaging operations at real-time rates.

=== IMPACT Series ===
Option	Improved Option	Framebuffer	Geometry Engines	Raster Engines	Texture Modules
SI	SE	13.5 MB	1	1	none
SI+T	SE+T	13.5 MB	1	1	1 (4 MB)
SSI	SSE	27 MB	2	2	none
MXI	MXE	27 MB	2	2	2 (4 MB)

=== VPro Series ===
Model	Colour depth	Memory	Texture memory (maximum)	Geometry engine speed
V6	48-bit RGBA	32 MB	8 MB	Original
V8	48-bit RGBA	128 MB	104 MB	Original
V10	48-bit RGBA	32 MB	8 MB	2× original
V12	48-bit RGBA	128 MB	104 MB	2× original

=== Audio ===
Audio hardware is standard. Even without extensions they can support low-latency (3 ms input-to-output) audio streams. Alesis ADAT 8-channel, 24-bit optical ports are built-in, along with S/PDIF or AES/EBU optical and coaxial ports.

=== Case ===
The Octane cases are large (30x40x35 cm) and heavy (25 kg), but with no internal 5.25" drive bays, so external CD-ROM drives must be connected if desired. Extensions include video I/O, audio I/O, networking, real-time video compression boards, and external storage options (through SCSI, Fiber Channel, or FireWire). Octanes can use standard PCI cards with the optional PCI cardcage (which provides one half-length and two full-length 5V 64-bit PCI slots), or a PCI to XIO adapter (known as a 'shoehorn' which provides a single 3.3/5V 64-bit PCI slot). Older Octanes can be upgraded with VPro graphics however V10 and V12 graphics board require Xbow revision 1.4 and a Cherokee power supply. VPro V6 and V8 require Xbow revision 1.3 and a Cherokee power supply.

Octane skins come in three types. The original Octane has green skins with the original SGI 'cube' logo. The later model Octanes have skins of the same color as the original, but with Octane2-style lettering and logos. Octane2 systems have blue skins with the modern lowercase letter-only SGI logo.

=== I/O subsystem ===
Octane series has two SCSI controllers that supports Ultra Wide SCSI devices. Systems can have a maximum of three internal 3.5" SCSI SCA devices, using proprietary mounting sleds that are also compatible with the Origin 2000, Origin 200, and Onyx2. An external Ultra Wide SCSI port is used for connecting external devices.

=== Operating systems ===
The SGI Octane with IMPACT-class graphics was first supported by IRIX version 6.4. VPro-class graphics have been supported since IRIX version 6.5.10 for V6 and V8, with V10 and V12 graphics supported as of 6.5.11 (or 6.5.10 with a special driver patch).

Linux and OpenBSD have had support.
