= SGI VPro =

Computer graphics subsystem

IMPACT
- Release date: 2000; 26 years ago
- Designed by: Silicon Graphics
- Codename: Odyssey

Cards
- Entry-level: V6
- Mid-range: V10
- High-end: V8
- Enthusiast: V12

History
- Predecessor: IMPACT

Support status
- Unsupported

VPro, also known as Odyssey, is a computer graphics architecture for Silicon Graphics workstations. First released on the Octane2, it was subsequently used on the Fuel and Tezro workstations and the Onyx visualization systems, where it was branded InfinitePerformance.

VPro provides some very advanced capabilities such as per-pixel lighting, also known as "phong shading", (through the SGIX_fragment_lighting extension) and 48-bit RGBA color. On the other hand, later designs suffered from constrained bandwidth and poorer texture mapping performance compared to competing GPU solutions, which rapidly caught up to SGI in the market.

Four different Odyssey-based VPro graphics board revisions existed, designated V6, V8, V10 and V12. The first series were the V6 and V8, with 32MB and 128MB of RAM respectively; the V10 and V12 had double the geometry performance of the older V6/V8, but were otherwise similar. The V6 and V10 can have up to 8MB RAM allocated to textures, while V8 and V12 can have up to 108MB RAM used for textures. The V10 and V12 boards used in Fuel, Tezro and Onyx 3000 computers use a different XIO connector than the cards used in Octane2 workstations.

The VPro graphics subsystem consists of an SGI proprietary chipset and associated software. The chip set consists of the buzz ASIC, the pixel blaster and jammer (PB&J) ASIC, and associated SDRAM. The buzz ASIC is a single-chip graphics pipeline. It operates at 251 MHz and contains on-chip SRAM. The buzz ASIC has three interfaces:

- Host (16-bit, 400-MHz peer-to-peer XIO link)
- SDRAM (The SDRAM is 32 MB (V6 or V10) or 128 MB (V8 or V12); the memory bus operates at half the speed of the buzz ASIC.)
- PB&J ASIC

As a result of a patent infringement settlement, SGI acquired rights to some of the Nvidia Quadro GPUs and released VPro-branded products (the V3, VR3, V7 and VR7) based on these (the GeForce 256, Quadro, Quadro 2 MXR, and Quadro 2 Pro, respectively). These cards share nothing with the original Odyssey line and could not be used in SGI MIPS workstations.

All VPro boards support the OpenGL ARB imaging extensions, allowing for hardware acceleration of numerous imaging operations at real-time rates.

== VPro Series (Odyssey-based) ==
Model	Colour depth	Memory	Texture memory (maximum)	Geometry engine speed
V6	48-bit RGBA	32 MB	8 MB	Original
V8	48-bit RGBA	128 MB	104 MB	Original
V10	48-bit RGBA	32 MB	8 MB	2× original
V12	48-bit RGBA	128 MB	104 MB	2× original
