= SGI Indigo2 =

Workstation computers

Indigo2

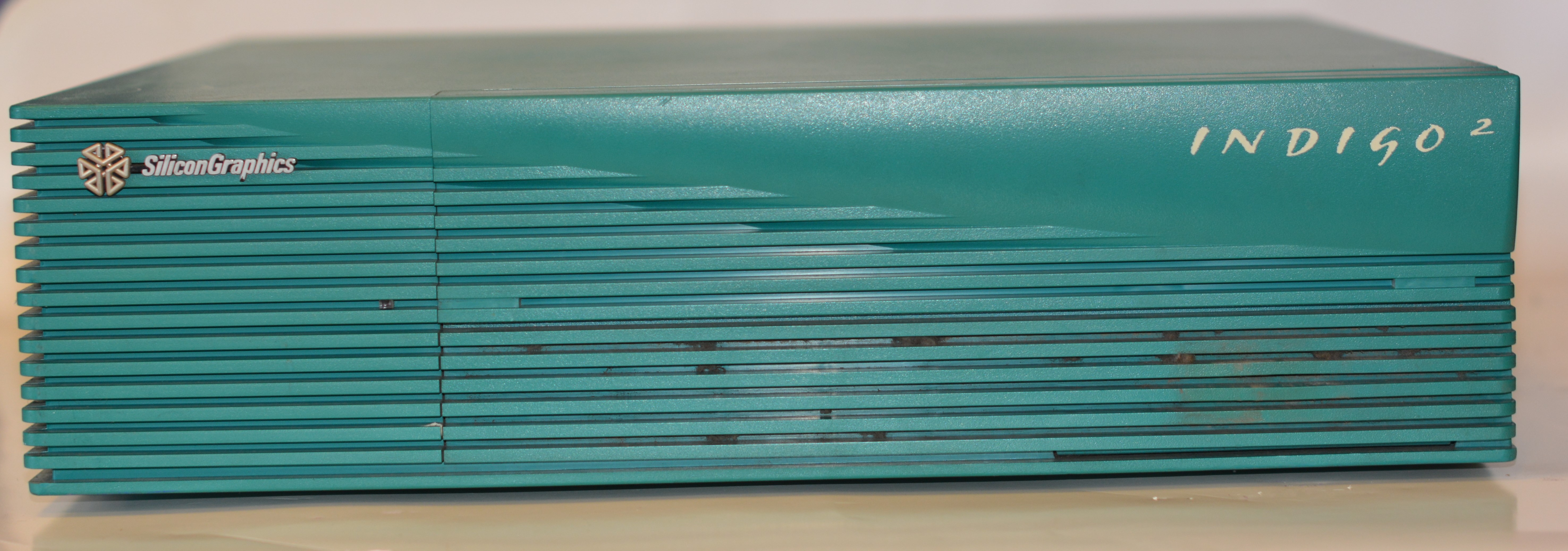
- Manufacturer: Silicon Graphics, Inc.
- Released: 1992; 34 years ago
- Discontinued: 1997
- Operating system: IRIX
- CPU: MIPS architecture
- Memory: 16 MB – 1 GB
- Predecessor: SGI Indigo
- Successor: SGI Octane
- Website: sgi.com

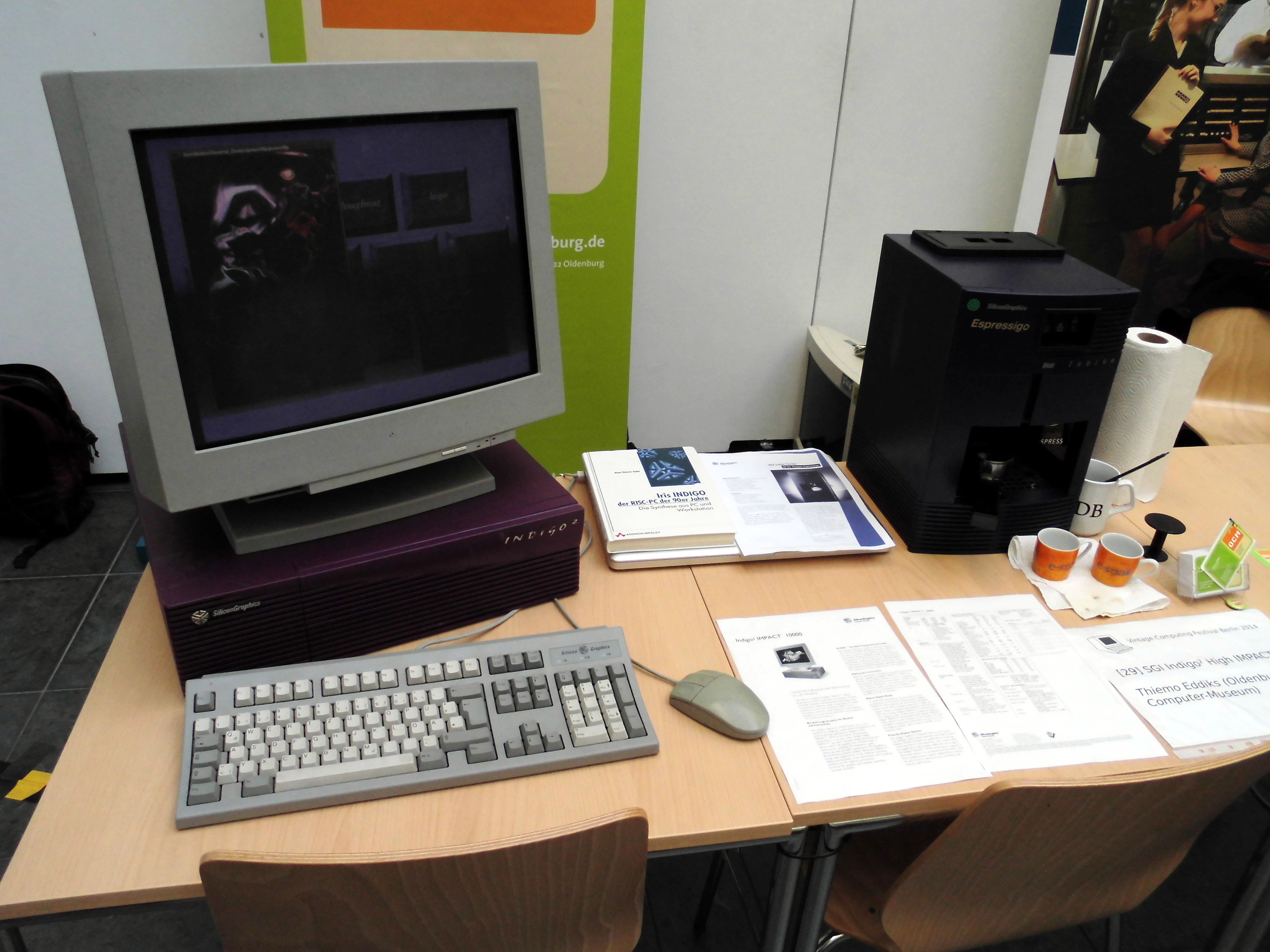
SGI Indigo2 IMPACT and a promotional SGI espresso machine in an Indigo case

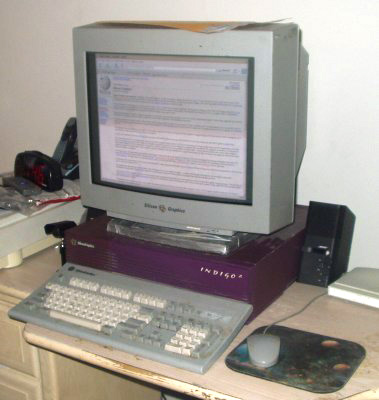
Indigo2 IMPACT R10000

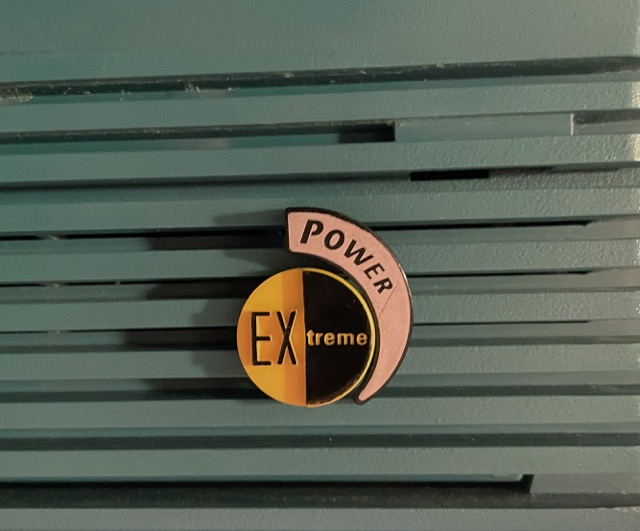
Badge for a Power Indigo2 with Extreme Graphics

The SGI Indigo2 (stylized as Indigo^{2}), codenamed "Fullhouse", is a Unix workstation designed and sold by SGI from 1992 to 1997. The Indigo preceded the Indigo2, which is succeeded by the Octane. The Indigo2 was repackaged as a server model called Challenge M.

== Overview ==
Indigo2 desktop workstations have two models: the teal Indigo2 and the purple IMPACT. Both have identical looking cases except color, and sub-model case badging. The CPU types, the amount of RAM, and graphics capabilities, depend on the model or sub-model variation. Power Indigo2 is a version of the teal Indigo2, with the R8000 chipset and strong floating-point arithmetic performance. The later IMPACT Indigo2 workstation model has more computational and visualization power, especially due to the introduction of the R10000 series RISC CPU and IMPACT graphics.

=== CPU ===
All Indigo2 models use one of four distinct MIPS CPU variants: the 100 to 250 MHz MIPS R4000 and R4400, and the Quantum Effect Devices R4600 (IP22 mainboard); the 75 MHz MIPS R8000 (IP26 mainboard); and the 175 to 195 MHz R10000 (IP28 mainboard), which are featured in the last produced Indigo2 model, the IMPACT10000. Each microprocessor family differs in clock frequency, and in primary and secondary cache capacity.

=== RAM ===
All Indigo2 motherboards have 12 SIMM slots, for standard 36-bit parity 72-pin fast page mode SIMM memory modules seated in groups of four. Indigo2 can be expanded to a thermal specification maximum of either 384 MB or 512 MB RAM. The design of the memory control logic in R10000 machines support up to 1 GB RAM, but the thermal output of older generation of DRAM chips necessitate the 512 MB limit. With newer, higher-density and smaller scale modules, 768 MB is easily within heat output specifications. Later 128 MB modules allow the full 1 GB with eight out of twelve sockets occupied.

=== Storage ===
All Indigo2 models can accommodate two 3.5" SCSI disk drives and one 5.25" SCSI CD-ROM drive inside bays on the front of the machine, using specially designed Indigo2 drive sleds with proprietary connectors. All three drive bays are easily accessed when removing the Indigo2 front bezel. The internal SCSI bus speed of the Indigo2 is about 10 MB/s. The typical hard disks are narrow (SCSI-1) 5200rpm and 7200rpm drives. All of the Indigo2 drive sleds have a 50-pin female SCSI-1 connector and standard 4-pin power connector. Advanced U160 and U320 SCSI disk drives can also be used but then one needs appropriate adapters (80/68-pin to 50-pin SCSI).

=== Networking ===
10Mbit on-board LAN interface, 100Mbit LAN options were made by third parties, either via EISA or GIO64 expansion cards. The two most known and widely used Indigo2 network cards are the 3Com 3C597-TX 100Mbit EISA, and the Phobos G160 GIO64. The second one offers better overall performance due to using the superior GIO64 bus, which also has the effect of reducing the CPU utilization due to DMA transfers.

=== Graphics ===
The graphics options available for the Indigo2 can be divided in two groups: the pre-IMPACT and the MGRAS IMPACT boards.

Pre-IMPACT options consist of the following options: Indigo2 XL24, Indigo2 XZ, Elan, and Extreme. These options are based on the same Express Graphics architecture from the original SGI Indigo, but feature improved performance. The Indigo2 XZ was launched in August 1993 at $25,500 (equivalent to $56,800 in 2025) and the Indigo2 XL was launched in third quarter 1993 at $18,000 (equivalent to $40,100 in 2025).

The MGRAS IMPACT (or just IMPACT) family include the Solid IMPACT, High IMPACT, High IMPACT AA, and the Maximum IMPACT. These newer boards have a different architecture than the earlier designs. Physically, they appear to be similar to the older graphics options; the low-end Solid IMPACT board takes up a single GIO-64 slot, the mid-range High IMPACT takes up two GIO-64 slots, and the high end Maximum IMPACT occupies three. The High IMPACT and Solid IMPACT boards provide the same performance for non-textured tasks, while the Maximum IMPACT provides double the performance. The High IMPACT AA option has the geometry performance of a Maximum IMPACT, but is otherwise the same as the High IMPACT including the pixel fill performance.

The IMPACT graphics is the first desktop graphics system from SGI to offer texture mapping acceleration, though only the High IMPACT and Maximum IMPACT had this capability, and comes with 1 MB of texture memory as standard. The Solid IMPACT card is named "Solid" due to its applications for solid (non-textured) modeling. When expanded by adding a TRAM (Texture RAM) module to the board, the amount of texture memory can be increased to 4 MB. Maximum IMPACT graphics require two of these modules due its two pixel units, although this does not upgrade them to 8 MB, with the two modules merely working in parallel to render twice as fast. Of all contemporaries, Maximum IMPACT graphics is the world's fastest desktop visualization solution. A Maximum IMPACT with 4 MB of texture memory and the correct graphics settings can play the first three of the Quake video game series with acceptable frame rates.

All graphics options for Indigo2 use the standard 13W3 connector for connecting the monitor and another connector for 3D stereoscopic glasses.

It is possible to have a dual-head Indigo2 by merely adding another Solid IMPACT card. Valid configurations include Solid/Solid, Solid/High, Solid/Maximum. Although there are four GIO-64 slots available and the High IMPACT takes up two, it is not possible to have a High/High configuration.

The IMPACT boards draw more power than the GIO-64 bus can deliver, so IMPACT-ready systems have additional power connectors on the expansion riser card, with a separate connection to the power supply. An IMPACT-ready Indigo2 must have an IMPACT-ready riser card, an IMPACT-ready power supply, and a sufficiently recent PROM revision. The Indigo2's successor, the SGI Octane, has an upgraded XIO bus and the same graphics options in repackaged form.

== Challenge M ==
The Challenge M is a server which differs from the Indigo2 only by a slightly differently colored and badged case, and the absence of graphics and sound hardware. Both systems are based on the MIPS processors, with EISA bus and SGI proprietary GIO64 expansion bus via a riser card.
