= IMPACT (computer graphics) =

Graphics subsystem by Silicon Graphics

- Release date: 1995; 30 years ago
- Designed by: Silicon Graphics

Cards
- Mid-range: Solid IMPACT, SI, SE
- High-end: High IMPACT, SSI, SSE
- Enthusiast: Maximum IMPACT, MXI, MXE

History
- Predecessor: Extreme Graphics
- Successor: SGI VPro

Support status
- Unsupported

IMPACT (sometimes spelled Impact) is a computer graphics architecture for Silicon Graphics computer workstations. IMPACT Graphics was developed in 1995 and was available as a high-end graphics option on workstations released during the mid-1990s. IMPACT graphics gives the workstation real-time 2D and 3D graphics rendering capability similar to that of even high-end PCs made well after IMPACT's introduction. IMPACT graphics systems consist of either one or two Geometry Engines and one or two Raster Engines in various configurations.

IMPACT graphics consists of five graphics subsystems: the Command Engine, Geometry Subsystem, Raster Engine, framebuffer and Display Subsystem. IMPACT Graphics can produce resolutions up to 1600 x 1200 pixels with 32-bit color and can also process unencoded NTSC and PAL analog television signals.

IMPACT graphics subsystems come in three configurations for SGI Indigo2 IMPACT workstations: Solid IMPACT, High IMPACT, and Maximum IMPACT. The equivalent configurations also exist for the SGI Octane workstation but are referred to as SI, SSI, and MXI (I-series). Later Octane workstations used a similar configuration but with updated ASIC chips and are referred to as SE, SSE, and MXE (E-series). IMPACT uses Rambus RDRAM for texture memory.

The IMPACT graphics architecture was superseded by SGI's VPro graphics architecture in 1997.
