= Barco =

Barco is the common Spanish word for ship. Barco may also refer to:

== Technology ==
- Barco (manufacturer), a Belgian multinational display hardware manufacturer
- Barco ETS, former name of Ucamco, a Belgian multinational printed circuit board software and hardware manufacturer
- Barco ColorTone, a stripped-down version of the Barco Creator image manipulation program
- Barco Creator, an image manipulation program targeted at the repro and print shop markets

== People ==
- Barco (surname)

== Towns and villages ==
- Barco, Covilhã, a village in the Covilhã Municipality of the Castelo Branco District of Portugal
- Barco, Guimarães, a village in the Guimarães Municipality of the Braga District of Portugal
- Barco, North Carolina, an unincorporated community in the United States
- Barcial del Barco, a municipality in the province of Zamora, Castile and León, Spain
- Manzanal del Barco, a municipality in the province of Zamora, Castile and León, Spain
- Nava del Barco, a municipality in the province of Ávila, Castile and León, Spain
- O Barco de Valdeorras, a municipality in the Galicia region of north-west Spain
- Soto del Barco, a small, coastal municipality in the Principality of Asturias, Spain
- Soto del Barco (parish), one of five parishes (administrative divisions) in Soto del Barco

== Other ==
- Barco Law Building, housing the University of Pittsburgh School of Law
- Barco oil concession, a major oilfield in Colombia, now depleted
- CD Barco, a Spanish football team based in O Barco de Valdeorras
- Lake Barco, a lake in Putnam County, Florida, United States
- Laguna del Barco, a lake in the Sierra de Gredos near the town of El Barco de Ávila

== See also ==
- El Barco (disambiguation)
