= University of Pittsburgh School of Law alumni =

Following is a list of notable alumni of the University of Pittsburgh School of Law.

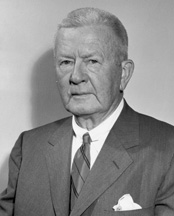
James Duff, 34th Pennsylvania governor

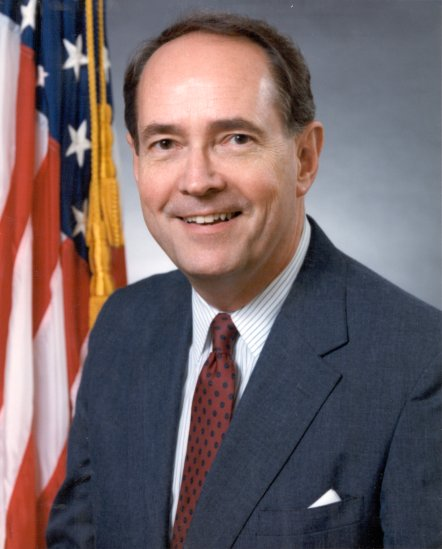
Dick Thornburgh, 41st Pennsylvania governor and 76th United States attorney general

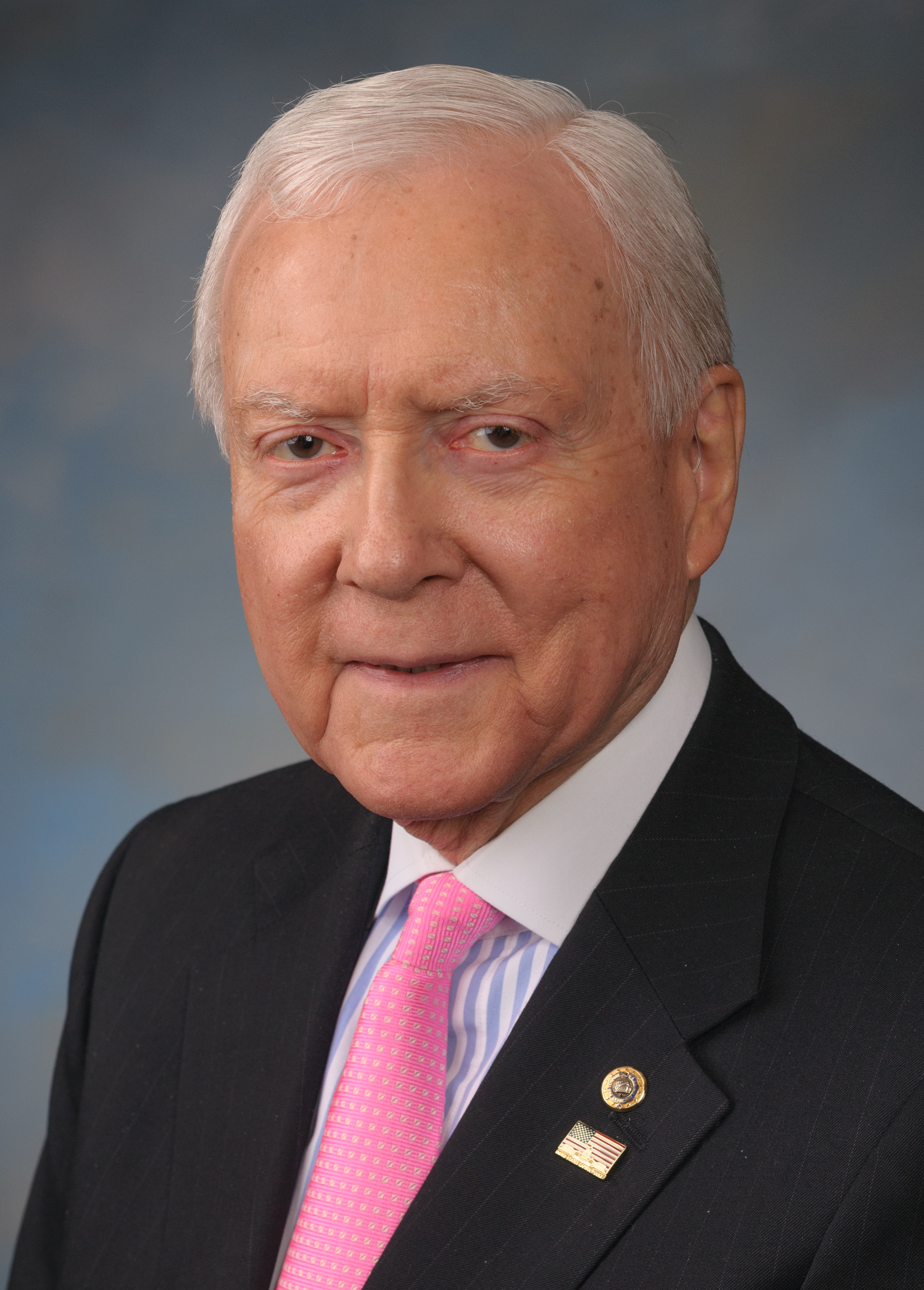
Orrin Hatch, president pro tempore of the U.S. Senate

== Academia ==
- Derrick Bell (1957) - first tenured black professor at Harvard Law School
- David J. Hickton (1981) - director and founder of the University of Pittsburgh Institute for Cyber Law, Policy and Security, staff director and senior counsel to the House Select Subcommittee on the Coronavirus Crisis, former U.S. attorney for the Western District of Pennsylvania

== Business ==
- George Barco (1934) - cable television executive who played a key role in development of that industry
- Yolanda Barco (1949) - cable television executive
- Dawne Hickton (1983) - vice chair, president, CEO of RTI International Metals

== Entertainment ==
- Anne Feeney (1978) - folk musician, political activist and attorney

== Government ==
- Pavel Astakhov (2002) - children's ombudsman of Russia (2009–present)
- Q. Todd Dickinson (1977) - former under secretary of Commerce for Intellectual Property and director of the United States Patent and Trademark Office (USPTO) (1999–2001); current executive director of the American Intellectual Property Law Association (AIPLA)
- Cyril Wecht (1962) - forensic pathologist who was Allegheny County coroner and medical examiner

== Judiciary ==
- Ruggero J. Aldisert (1947) - U.S. Court of Appeals for the Third Circuit 1968–1986
- Anne X. Alpern (1927) - first female attorney general of Pennsylvania and first woman to serve on the Supreme Court of Pennsylvania
- Ralph J. Cappy (1968) - justice (1990–2008) and chief justice of the Pennsylvania Supreme Court (2003–2008)
- Robert J. Cindrich (1968) - former U.S. attorney and U.S. district judge
- Mark R. Hornak (1981) - chief judge for the United States District Court for the Western District of Pennsylvania (2011–present)
- Susan Richard Nelson (1978) - judge for the United States District Court for the District of Minnesota
- Maryellen Noreika (1993) - judge for the United States District Court for the District of Delaware
- Sara Soffel (1916) - judge of the Allegheny County Court and Pennsylvania Courts of Common Pleas; first woman to serve as a judge in Pennsylvania
- Debra Todd (1982) - justice on the Pennsylvania Supreme Court (2007–present; Current Chief Justice)
- Joseph F. Weis Jr. (1950) - U.S. Court of Appeals for the Third Circuit (1973–1988)

== Law ==
- Mary Beth Buchanan (1987) - United States attorney for the Western District of Pennsylvania (2001–2009)
- Linda Drane Burdick (1989) - chief assistant state attorney at the Orange and Osceola County State Attorney's Office in Orlando, Florida; lead prosecutor on the State of Florida vs. Casey Anthony case
- Harry W. Colmery (1916) - attorney, national commander of The American Legion, author of G.I. Bill
- Lucy Fato (1991) - corporate attorney, executive vice president and general counsel for Seaport Entertainment Group
- William Lerach (1970) - private securities class action attorney
- Roslyn Litman - lawyer who successfully sued the NBA on behalf of blackballed player Connie Hawkins
- Edgar Snyder (1966) - personal injury attorney
- Joseph "Chip" Yablonski (1965) - attorney for the NFL Players Association

== Politics ==
- W. Thomas Andrews (1966) - Pennsylvania state senator (1972–1980)
- Homer S. Brown (1923) - judge, civil and political rights activist, elected to the Pennsylvania House of Representatives (1934–1950)
- Earl Chudoff (1932) - U.S. representative (1949–1958)
- William Corbett (1927) - 2nd secretary of Guam (1953–1956) and the 3rd civilian governor of Guam (1956)
- Harmar D. Denny Jr. (1911) - U.S. representative (1951–1953)
- James H. Duff (1907) - Pennsylvania governor (1947–1951), U.S. senator (1951–1957)
- Charles H. Ealy (1908) - president pro tempore of the Pennsylvania Senate (1941–1944)
- Harry Allison Estep (1913) - U.S. representative (1927–1933)
- Tom Feeney (1983) - U.S. representative (2003–2009)
- Melissa Hart (1987) - U.S. representative (2001–2007)
- Orrin Hatch (1962) - president pro tempore of the U.S. Senate and U.S. senator (1977–2019)
- K. Leroy Irvis (1953) - first African-American to serve as a speaker of the house (Pennsylvania) in any state legislature in the United States since Reconstruction
- Dan Onorato (1989) - chief executive of Allegheny County (2003–2012)
- Vjosa Osmani (LLM 2005, SJD 2015) - 5th president of Kosovo (2021–present)
- David A. Reed (1903) - U.S. senator (1922–1935)
- Joseph H. Thompson (1908) - Pennsylvania state senator, Medal of Honor recipient, and college Football Hall of Fame player and coach
- Dick Thornburgh (1957) - Pennsylvania governor (1979–1987), U.S. attorney general (1988–1991)
- Mary Jo White (1967) - Pennsylvania state senator (1997–2012)
- James A. Wright (1927) - U.S. representative (1941–1945)
