= Barco Creator =

- Developer: Barco Graphics
- Stable release: 7.2 / 1999; 27 years ago?
- Operating system: Silicon Graphics IRIX
- Type: Graphics editor
- License: Proprietary
- Website: Archived December 6, 1998, at the Wayback Machine

Barco Creator was an image manipulation program targeted at the repro and print shop markets. It was developed by Barco Creative Systems a division of the Barco Group and first shown as a prototype at Parigraph in April 1988, then later at Ipex 88). Barco Creative Systems together with D.I.S.C. and Aesthedes merged into Barco Graphics. It ran on several generations of Silicon Graphics computers till the late 1990s. Barco Graphics (later Esko) ColorTone for Windows NT is considered its successor.

== History ==
Until the late 1980s, digital retouching required specialized hardware such as the Quantel Paintbox. Barco Creator was one of the first products to run on off-the-shelf SGI workstations instead. Originally targeted at the "high end", Creator evolved into a slightly more mid-market program with the "personal"-edition running on the Indy. Still the price was in the $10k to $100k range depending on options, and additional hardware was sometimes needed to speed up specific operations. While Creator could rely on superior features and performance to justify its price through the mid-1990s, as time progressed each new Photoshop version made the Barco package harder to sell. After the release of version 7.1 in late 1997 there were few new sales. In the end Creator was abandoned, like many of its contemporaries; Dalim Tango, Linotype-Hell DaVinci and Alias Eclipse. Its lineal successor, known as Esko ColorTone was discontinued in 2013.

== Features ==
=== Software modules ===
Creator was set up to be a modular system, tailored to the specific needs of each "shop" or user. The base for version 7.0 was the "CT-Brix" software library (colour selection, basic compositing, selection, transformation, shapes, basic colour correction, densitometer, layers etc.), also featured in other Barco Graphics CT (continuous tone) products, e.g. ColorTone. On top of this Creator added the "Creative functions" libraries (special effect filters; mosaic, emboss, b/w, warp etc.), "basic brush" module (size, thickness, shapes, styles, pressure sensitivity), "advanced brush" module (brush profiles, textures), "basic colour correction" module (gradation correction, pick mixer, plane mixer, colour mixer), "advanced colour correction" module (chain all of the basic correction tools, batch corrections, instant preview) and finally the "auto mask" module.

Optional software modules included "PrintView" (preview a given CMYK printing process), "BlackSmith" (modify CMYK files to reduce ink usage, better print quality) and "InkSwitch" (convert CMYK into special ink separations for packaging printing).

Barco ColorTone adds an "Image quality estimator" module (evaluate if an image is printable according to certain quality parameters), but lacks several of the other Creator modules.

Using the "Brix Organizer" software it was possible to group CT-Brix modules into "sessions" customised for the current workflow. One could for example disable both colour correction and the creative functions/filters, giving the operator an interface more focused on painting.

=== File formats ===
As of Barco Creator 7 support for foreign (non-Barco) file formats depended on a dedicated software "interface". Interfaces for Creator CVW files, TIFF, PSD (no layers) and EPS/DCS were standard. Optionally one could order interfaces for Hell and Scitex and Scitex online file formats.

=== Output ===
For the earlier versions, at least, the primary output were CT RGB (Scitex CT to be exposed on film recorders as LVT and Fire 1000) and CMYK formats (to Scitex, Hell, and IT8). One must keep in mind that the internet was just coming of age, and the whole prepress/magazine industry was almost exclusively based on film photographers and a film workflow.

== Development ==
=== Hardware ===
A typical hardware setup with Indigo2, 12x18" WACOM graphics tablet and 29" (2000x1600) Barco Calibrator monitor.

Creator originally ran on Silicon Graphics Power Series computers with one or more processors. By 1993 "Personal Creator" was available for the Indigo, while the "full" Power Creator ran on a Crimson. Later releases were available for the Indy, Indigo2, 02 and Octane computers. It is unknown if Creator will run on the later Octane2, Fuel and Tezro workstations with VPro graphics.

Due to its high end focus Barco developed several dedicated hardware options to speed up Creator.

For the Power Series and Crimson Barco originally supplied a "Colcom/VME" colour computer board, a fast multi-dimensional interpolator. This was replaced in early 1993 with the more powerful "Chameleon" board, integrating the discrete logic of the Colcom board in a custom ASIC. Its main purpose was displaying CMYK colours on the (RGB) monitor quickly. After version 7.0 the Chameleon was also used for accelerating certain colour correction operations.

For the release of Creator 6 Barco also added a Brush-accelerator board that made retouching with large brushes on files of several hundred megabytes possible.

Turnkey workstations were additionally supplied with a WACOM tablet, a Barco Reference Calibrator self-calibrating or Personal Calibrator monitor and SCSI RAID storage, though stripped-down versions were also available.

Input was usually from high-end scanners: Linotype-Hell, Crosfield Electronics, Dainippon Screen, or ICG (Itek Color Graphics). From the Indigo/Crimson versions the Howtek D4000 (4000dpi) drum scanner was usually offered as an option. Version 7 supported both the D4000 and the D7500 (5000dpi) scanner.

=== Release history ===
The feature set was basically frozen after Creator 7 (June 1996). The most apt comparison to the final release, featurewise, would be Adobe Photoshop 4 (November 1996).

Version	Hardware	O/S	Release date	Price	Significant changes (selected)
Creator 1.0 Prototype	Silicon Graphics 4D70G (Creator 2500); (Creator 2600)	IRIX 3.X	Fall 1988	?	RGB only
Creator CD, SP, SPX and MP	Personal Iris (CD)?, Power Series (SP, SPX and MP)?; Highest spec BG-Creator 540 (4D 240) with 4 R3000 processors at 25 MHz, 64MB RAM and 1.2GB harddrive. BG-530 and BG-520 with 2 and 1 processors respectively.	IRIX 3.X	1990	?	RGB only
Repro Creator	Power Series, later Crimson	IRIX 4.X?	1992	$155,000 incl Crimson	CMYK via Colorcom/VME board; Considerable price reduction compared to the previous models.
Personal Creator	(BG-510) Indigo, 32-96MB RAM, 1.2GB HD	IRIX 5.X?	1993	$25,000	RGB only; CMYK "Repro" version available w/96MB RAM, conversion done entirely in software; Considerable price reduction compared to the previous models.
Power Creator	(replaced BG-540) Crimson, 128MB RAM	IRIX 5.X?	1993	?	RGB only; CMYK "Repro" version available w/Chameleon board; Considerable price reduction compared to the previous models.
Personal Creator 5.0	Indy R4000 100mhz (61 SPECfp92, 57 SPECint92 - compare Intel P66; 55 fp, int 64)	?	1993	£38,000 (incl. Indy).	?
Creator 5.2	?	?	1994	$17,000	?
Creator 6.0	?	IRIX 5.X?	January 1995	$17,000	Interface improvements; Introduction of the Brush Accelerator board; Intelligent/Automated trapping; The ability to see color-correction operations alongside the reference image.
Creator 7.0	Indy and Indigo2, except R8000	IRIX 5.3	28/06/96 (CD1375C), 09/07/96 (CD1377C)	$30,000	X Window-based GUI; Tool bar with icons for the main tools; Line art module is based on a subset of Barco Strike!; Typesetting based on the Barco Strike! text engine; Unlimited amount of image and mask layers; Maximum brush size doubled, now 512 pixels. Faster brush drawing. Brush Accelerator is supported.; As of 09/07/96 IRIX 6.2 not supported, testing ongoing.
Creator 7.1	Indigo2 R10000, O2, Octane	IRIX 5.3, 6.2, 6.3, 6.4	15/12/97 (CD1488C)	$30,000	Higher performance overall. Between 1.5 and 4 times faster, depending on the operation.; Menus snap to each other; It is possible to control the behaviour of the Wacom tablet; Balloon help
Creator 7.2	O2, Octane	IRIX 6.5	08/04/99 (CD1546C)	$30,000	Updated to support IRIX 6.5

== Availability ==
Barco Creator was discontinued in the late 1990s, and was not picked up by Purup-Eskofot after it purchased the Graphics division of Barco. Neither Barco nor Esko have the ability to issue new licenses anymore. As Creator was only available in single nodelocked licenses, one would need to buy an original system with the license included to have a "full legal version".

== See also ==
- Barco ColorTone
- Linotype-Hell DaVinci
