= El Barco =

El Barco may refer to:

- El Barco de Ávila, a town in Spain
- El Barco (settlement), the first Spanish settlement in northern Argentina
- El Barco (Tucumán), a village in Argentina
- El Barco, Alicante, a residential apartment building
- El Barco (TV series), a Spanish TV series
- El Barco Lake (Laguna El Barco or Lago El Barco), a lake in the Bío Bío Region of Chile
- "El Barco" (song), a 2021 song by Karol G from the album KG0516

== See also ==
- Barco (disambiguation)
