= Barco (surname) =

Barco is a surname. Notable people with the name include:

- Álvaro Barco (born 1967), Peruvian international footballer
- Carolina Barco (born 1951), Colombian-American diplomat
- Ezequiel Barco (born 1999), Argentine professional footballer
- George Barco (1907–1989), American lawyer and cable television executive
- Hernán Barcos (born 1984), Argentine professional footballer
- Mandalit del Barco, Peruvian reporter for National Public Radio
- Mario Barco (born 1992), Spanish footballer
- Martín del Barco Centenera (1535 – c. 1602), Spanish cleric, explorer and author
- Miguel del Barco (1706–1790), Jesuit missionary in Baja California, Mexico
- Silvano Barco (born 1963), Italian cross country skier
- Valentín Barco (born 2004), Argentine professional footballer
- Virgilio Barco Isakson (born 1965), Colombian economist
- Virgilio Barco Vargas (1921–1997), 27th President of Colombia
- Yolanda Barco (1926–2000), American lawyer and cable TV executive
