= Pennsylvania Cable Network =

PCN (Pennsylvania Cable Network)
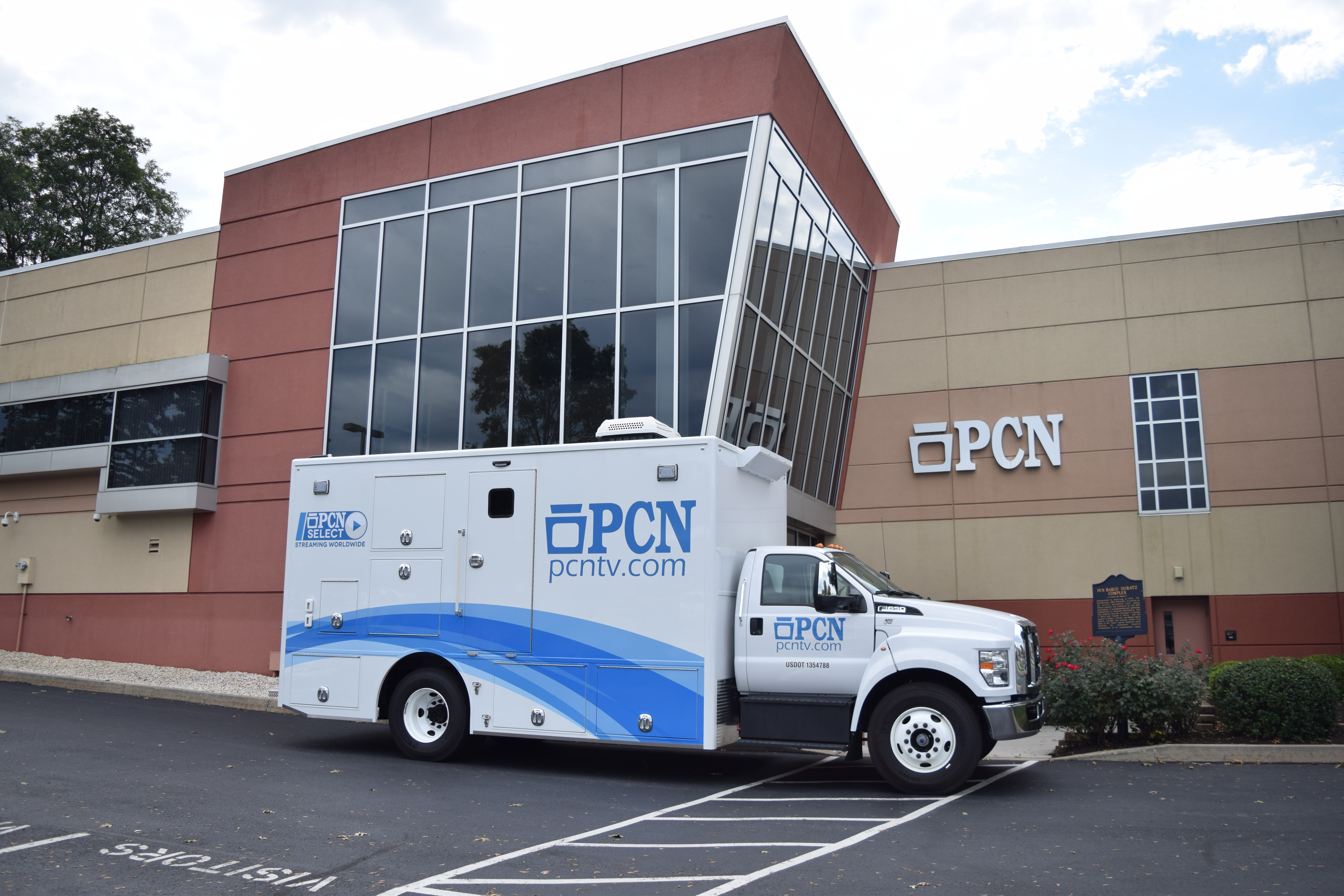
- PCN's headquarters in Camp Hill, Pennsylvania
- Type: Public affairs network
- Country: United States
- Broadcast area: Pennsylvania
- Headquarters: Camp Hill, Pennsylvania

Programming
- Language: English

Ownership
- Owner: Pennsylvania Educational Communications Systems
- Key people: David R. Breidinger (Chairman)

History
- Founded: August 29, 1979
- Launched: September 1979

Links
- Website: pcntv.com

Availability

Streaming media
- PCN Select Streaming Service: pcntv.com/how-to-watch/

PCN (the Pennsylvania Cable Network) is a private, non-profit cable television network dedicated to 24-hour coverage of government and public affairs in the Commonwealth of Pennsylvania. Built on the C-SPAN model, it features live coverage of both Houses of the Pennsylvania General Assembly, as well as other forms of informational and educational programming. It is available on every cable system in the state, and is also available on line through the PCN Select subscription service.

== History ==
The non-profit Pennsylvania Educational Communications System (PECS) was founded on August 29, 1979 by George Barco, who became the first president, his daughter Yolanda Barco and Joseph Gans. It was funded by eleven Pennsylvania cable television companies, and provided a network for distributing Educational-access television programming from Pennsylvania State University and headquartered in University Park, Pennsylvania. The network was officially launched in September of that year as Pennarama. Penn State had already launched Pennarama on an experimental basis in 1976 on a single cable system in Scranton. Both credit and non-credit courses were offered. The courses were available to all cable subscribers, but to get credit for the course, students needed to pay tuition that was offered at a reduced rate. The network was originally transmitted through a 796- mile microwave network.

George Barco died in 1989 and Yolanda Barco became president in 1990. She renamed it the Pennsylvania Cable Network (PCN) and began to reposition it as the state's "educational, public affairs and cultural cable TV network." In 1992, PCN began moving away from a strictly educational format, with its coverage of Governor Bob Casey's "Capitol for a Day" town hall meetings. In November 1993, PCN began to air public affairs programming four nights a week, eventually expanding to 7 nights a week by April 1995. In June 1994, the network began to be distributed via satellite, allowing it to expand its reach to the entire state.

PCN ended its relationship with Penn State on September 1, 1996, and assumed full responsibility for the network's operations and programming. The headquarters were also moved to Camp Hill, Pennsylvania. Around this time, PCN also began broadcasting programming from Deutsche Welle during the overnight hours. Its funding comes from the cable companies that carry PCN, and it receives neither commonwealth nor federal funds.

On September 12, 2025, PCN planned to consider airing Weather World and acquiring other WPSU-TV's programs from the station despite the decision by Penn State trustees to close WPSU-TV.

== Coverage ==
In addition to the Camp Hill headquarters (located near Harrisburg, the commonwealth capital), PCN also has bureaus in Philadelphia and Pittsburgh.

The majority of PCN's programming is live, unedited coverage of both houses of the General Assembly, press conferences, and meetings of various political and business organizations. PCN also features tours of Pennsylvania manufacturing plants, coverage of the annual State Farm Show, walking tours of Gettysburg Battlefield, and Call-in Programs with the state's political figures. "PA Books" a weekly show featuring authors of books on Pennsylvania topics, has been running since 1996. PCN also televises Weather World, a fifteen-minute weather program from the Pennsylvania State University Department of Meteorology.

Coverage of Pennsylvania Interscholastic Athletic Association (PIAA) championships in most sports is also produced and broadcast by PCN. PCN also broadcasts college sports from Lebanon Valley College and Alvernia University.

== See also ==
- C-SPAN
- The Gettysburg Collection
- Pennsylvania Interscholastic Athletic Association (PIAA)
