= Callaqui =

Mountain in Chile

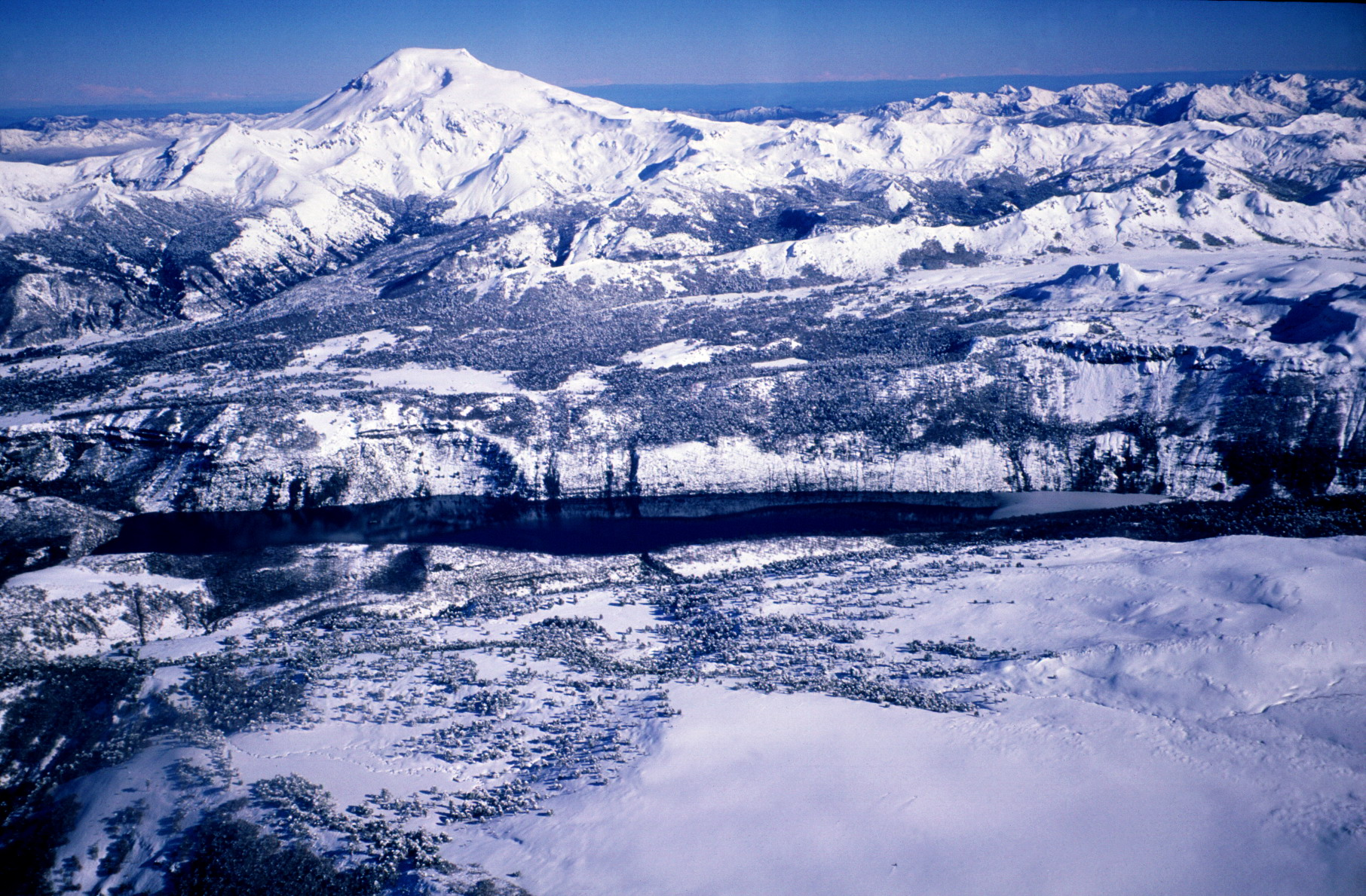
- El Barco Lake in the foreground, Callaqui in the background left

Highest point
- Elevation: 3,164 m (10,381 ft)
- Coordinates: 37°55′0″S 71°27′0″W

Geography
- Location: Chile
- Parent range: Andes

Geology
- Mountain type: Fissure stratovolcano
- Last eruption: October 1980

Callaqui is a stratovolcano located in the Bío Bío Region of Chile. It is a large ice-capped, basaltic andesite volcano which is elongated in the northeast-southwest direction, due to its construction along an 11 km (7 mi) long fissure. Numerous cinder cones and lava flows have erupted from vents along this linear fissure. Most of the activity at Callaqui has been fumarolic. Minor eruptions were reported 1751, 1864, and 1937, and the latest eruption was a small phreatic eruption in 1980.

Together with Hekla in Iceland, Callaqui is one of the few volcanoes with a morphology between a crater row and stratovolcano (built from mixed lava and tephra eruptions).

The volcano is the centerpiece of Ralco National Reserve.

== See also ==
- List of volcanoes in Chile
