= Mandalit del Barco =

American radio personality

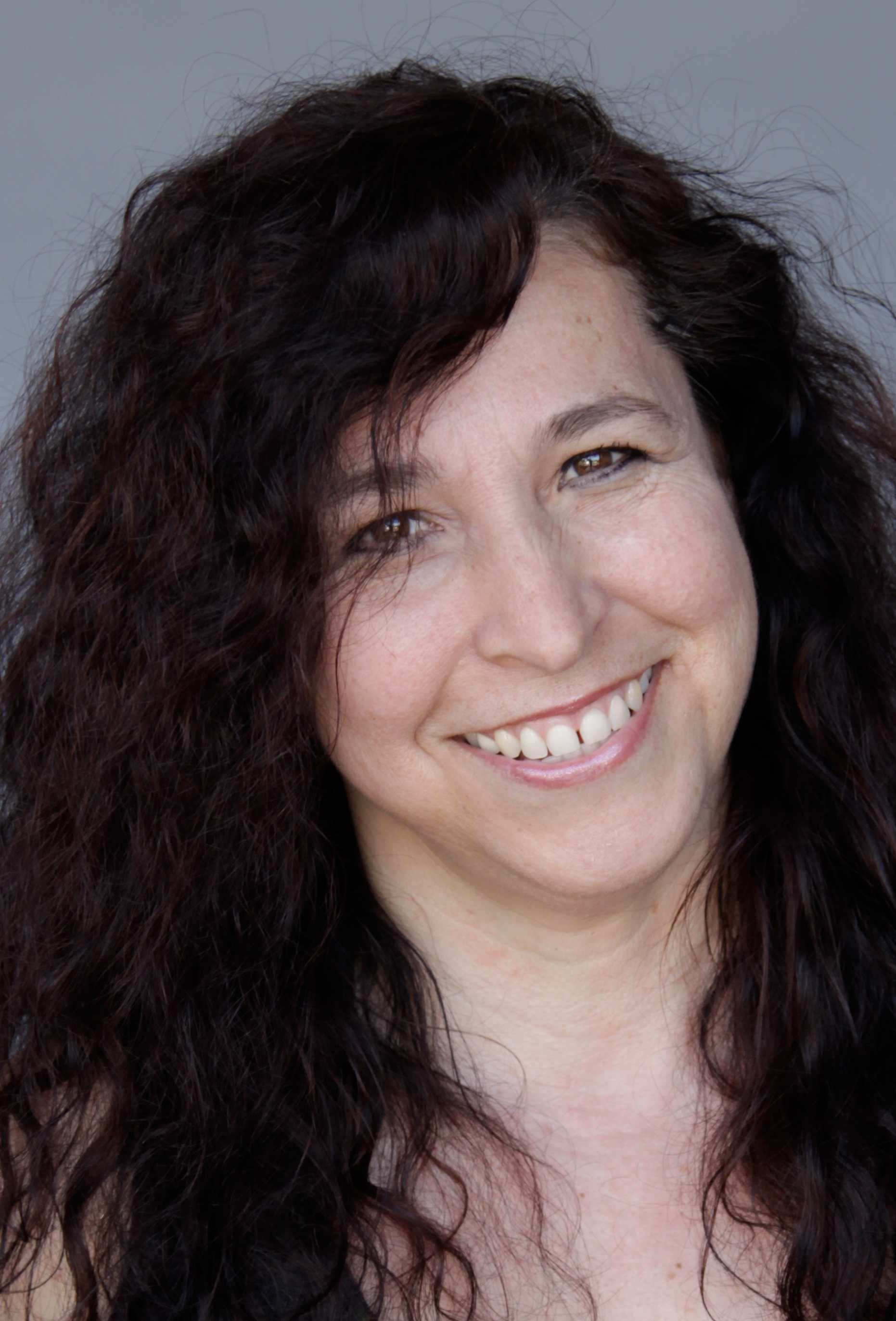
Mandalit del Barco at the 2019 National Book Festival

Mandalit del Barco (Spanish pronunciation: [mandaˈlið ðel ˈβaɾko]) is an arts and culture reporter for NPR News (National Public Radio). A fourth generation journalist, she was born in Lima, Peru, to a Peruvian father and a Mexican-American mother. Her stories are featured on all NPR shows and platforms, including All Things Considered, Morning Edition, Weekend Edition and NPR.org. Del Barco has also been published in numerous anthologies.

Based at NPR West in Culver City, California, del Barco reports and produces stories about cultural topics. Since 1998, she has reported for NPR from the red carpet and backstage at the Academy Awards and the Grammy Awards. as well as the Golden Globes. She also regularly reports from the Sundance Film Festival.

In the 1990s and 2000s, she chronicled street gangs in Los Angeles. She traveled to Tokyo to cover the summer Olympics, to Puerto Rico to cover the effects of Hurricane Maria, to Haiti to report on the earthquake. In 2022, she reported, narrated and produced a five part series on "Latinos in Hollywood."

== Biography ==
Del Barco was raised in Baldwin, Kansas and Oakland, California. She spent the year of 1999–2000 living and working in her native Peru as a Fulbright Fellow and on a fellowship with the Knight International Centre for Journalists. While there, she worked on a documentary project about Peruvian culture and politics, as well stories of those internally displaced during Peru's internal conflicts.

After studying Anthropology and Rhetoric at U.C. Berkeley and writing for The Daily Californian, she earned her master's degree in journalism at Columbia University, where she wrote her masters thesis entitled "Breakdancers; Who Are They and Why are They Spinning On Their Heads?” She continued her career as a journalist for The Miami Herald and also spent time working for The Village Voice. She first began working in radio while in New York. She moved to Los Angeles in 1993 from New York City, where she was a reporter for WNYC. She has lived in Los Angeles since 1993, and is a longtime correspondent for NPR News.

Del Barco has had tremendous influence on many up-and-coming journalists. She has been a student mentor on the National Association of Hispanic Journalists (NAHJ) and Unity student projects as well as mentoring young journalists outside this venue. At its 2015 annual conference, the National Council of La Raza (NCLR) presented Del Barco with the Ruben Salazar Award for Communications, citing among her achievements, her "empowering young female journalists".

In 2012, she was chosen by the public as having the "Best Name In Public Radio" according to a poll conducted by NPR.
