= Barco, Guimarães =

Barco
- Civil parish
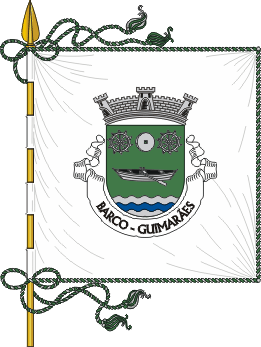
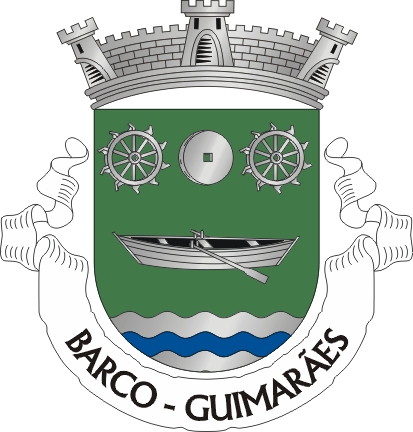
- Flag Coat of arms

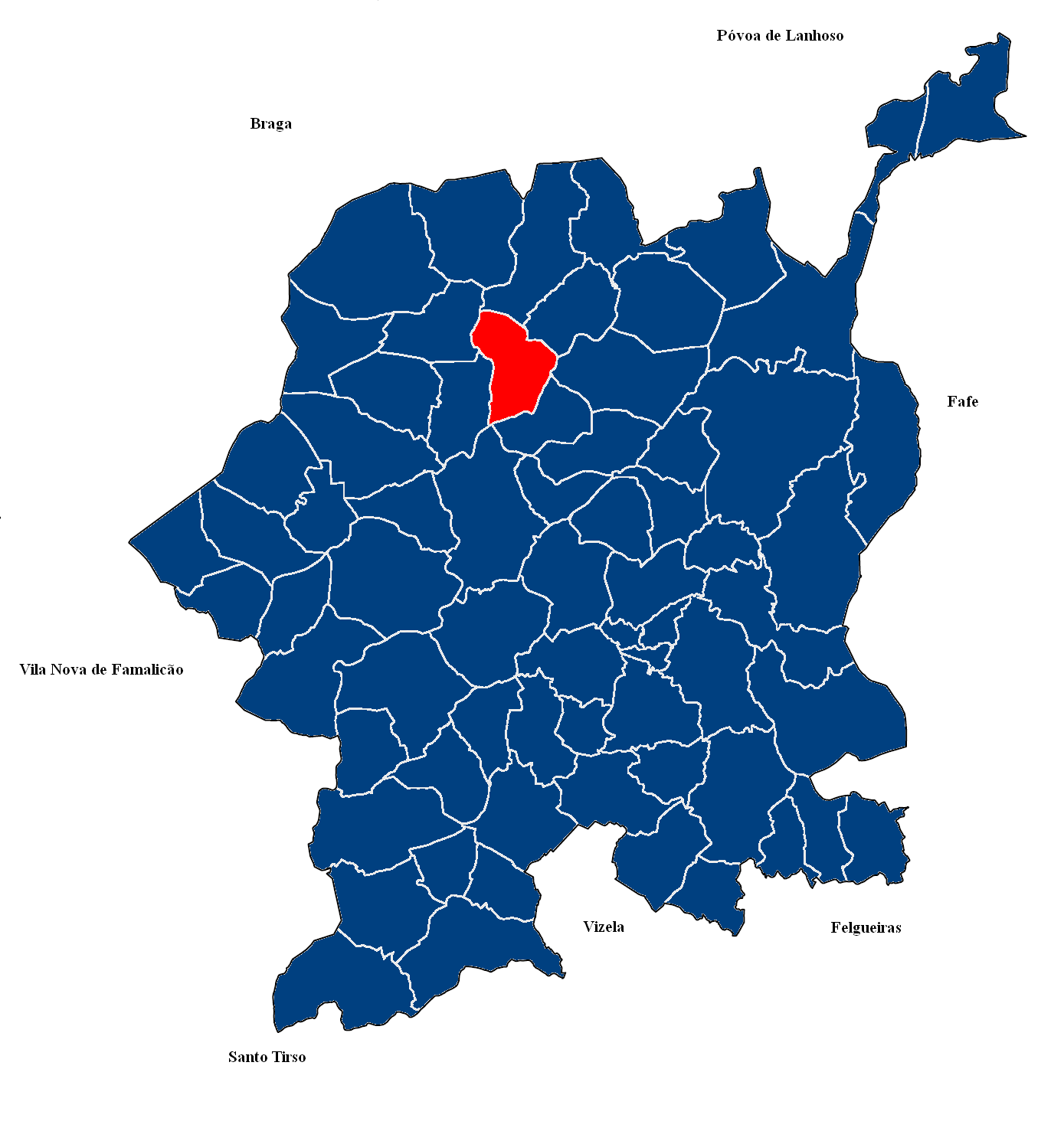
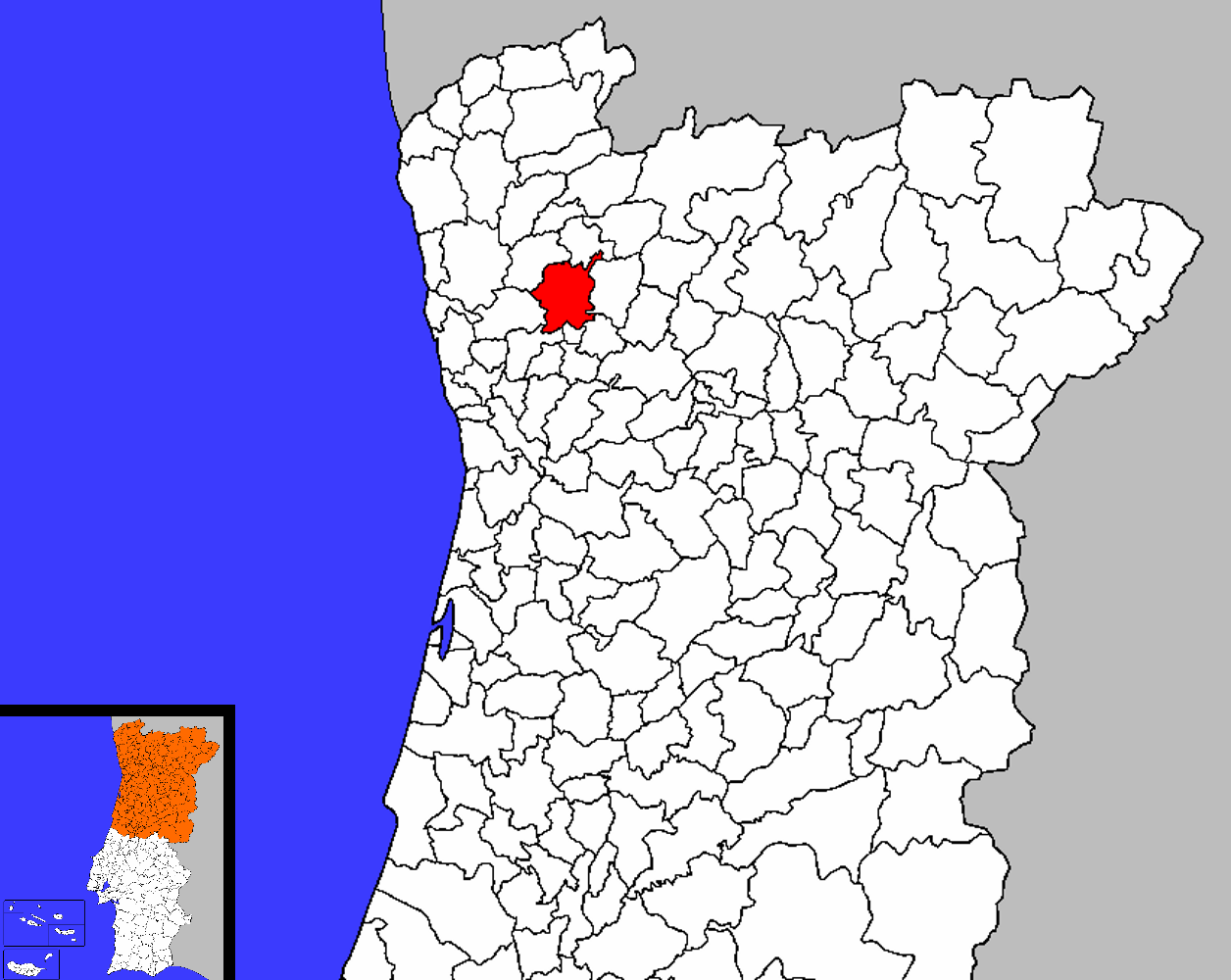
- Coordinates: 41.498°N 8.326°W
- Country: Portugal
- Region: Norte
- Intermunic. comm.: Ave
- District: Braga
- Municipality: Guimarães

Area
  - Total: 3.02 km^{2} (1.17 sq mi)

Population (2021)
  - Total: 1,439
  - Density: 480/km^{2} (1,200/sq mi)
- Time zone: UTC+00:00 (WET)
  - Summer (DST): UTC+01:00 (WEST)

Barco is a civil parish in the municipality of Guimarães in the Braga District of Portugal. The population in 2021 was 1,439, in an area of 3.02 km^{2}.
