= Scitex CT =

Scitex Continuous Tone or Scitex CT is an image file format. It is designed specifically for use on Scitex graphics processing equipment. Its use is supported by numerous graphics suites and desktop publishing packages, such as Adobe Photoshop, Adobe InDesign, and QuarkXPress.

== Properties ==
The Scitex CT format enables high-quality images to be processed on Scitex computers. Supports CMYK (Cyan, Magenta, Yellow, Key), RGB and grayscale images, but does not support alpha channels.

They consist of:

- a control block,
- a parameter block,
- the image data.

Scitex CT images typically represent 4 colors. A colored pixel is up to 128 bits in size (16 separations). Separations 1 through 4 are for CMYK colors. Separations from 5 to 16 are reserved in case the format of these images is expanded in the future. The data in the first separation is followed by the data in the second separation and so with the rest

== Utilities ==
This type of image format is often used in jobs that require color. For example in magazine ads, newspapers …
