= Barco Law Building =

Academic building in Pittsburgh, US

Coordinates: 40.441885°N 79.955707°W

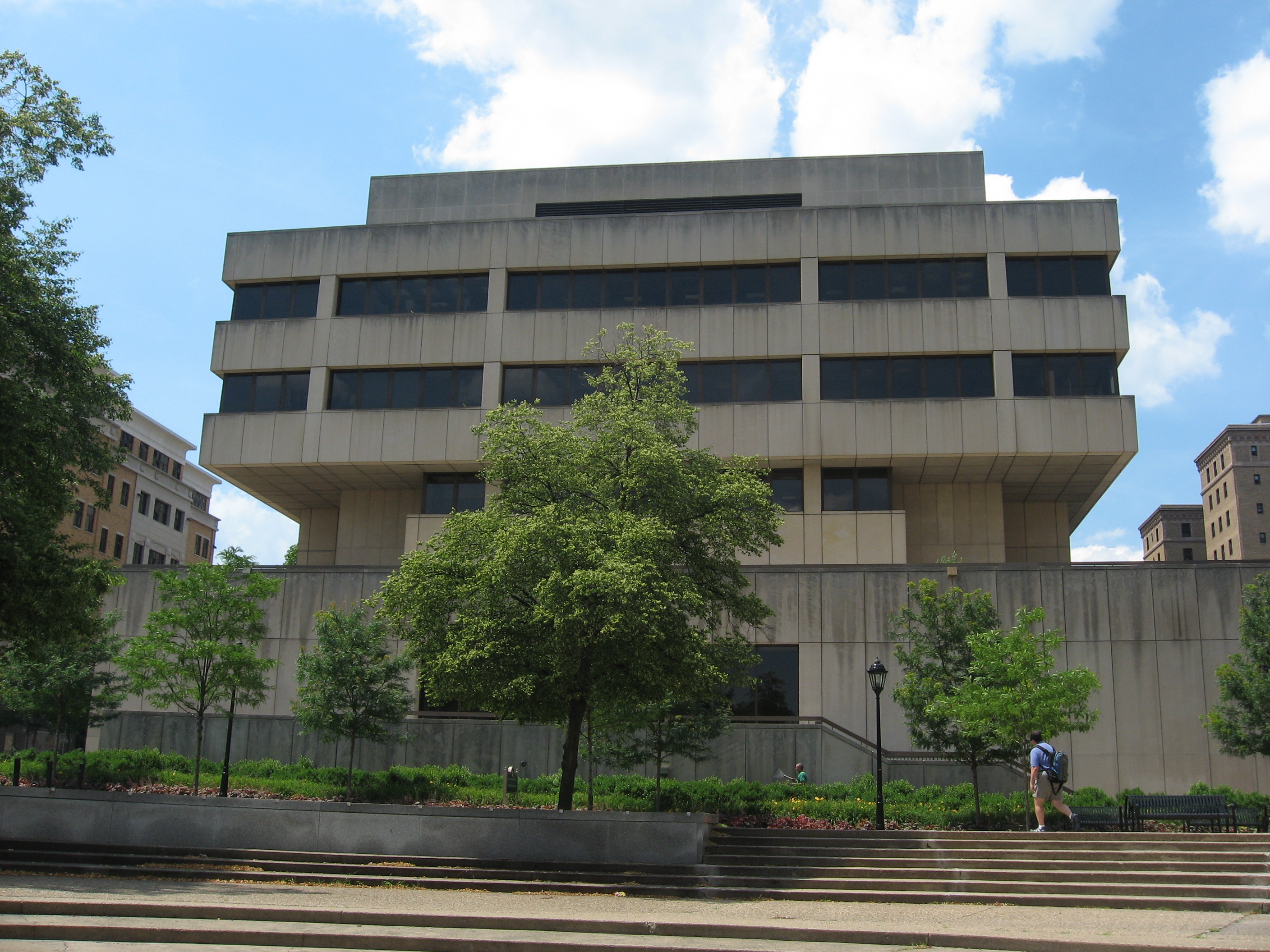
Barco Law Building at the University of Pittsburgh.

Barco Law Building is an academic building housing the University of Pittsburgh School of Law on the campus of the University of Pittsburgh in Pittsburgh, Pennsylvania, United States. The $8.5 million ($50.9 million today) six-story building was opened in January 1976 and dedicated on May 1, 1976. The Barco Law Building was designed by the architectural firm of Johnstone, Newcomer and Valentour and is a classic example of brutalist architecture.

== History ==
The University of Pittsburgh has offered law classes since 1843. The School of Law was officially founded in 1895, making it one of the oldest law schools in the nation. In 1900, the law school joined with 31 other schools to form the Association of American Law Schools.

== Name ==
On June 19, 2003, Pitt's School of Law Building was renamed as the Barco Law Building, in memory of George J. Barco and his daughter, Yolanda G. Barco. The Barcos were graduates of Pitt's School of Law and former trustees who were long-standing supporters of the law school, both in life and through their estates. George Barco served as trustee from January 1972 to March 1980, when he was elected as an emeritus trustee. Yolanda Barco served as trustee from February 1990 to June 1997 and was elected an emerita trustee in October 1997.

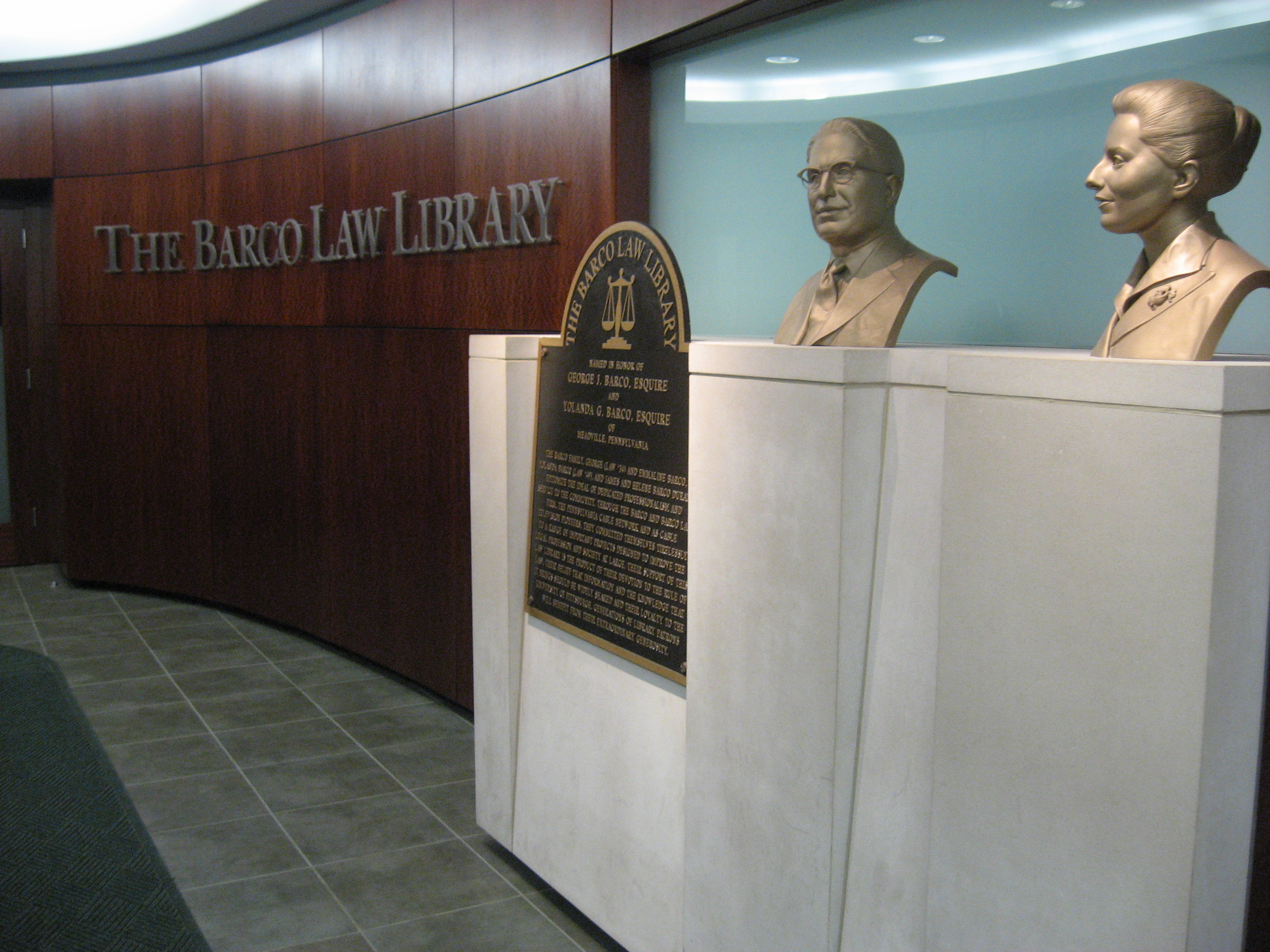
George and Yolanda Barco's busts in the Barco Law Library

== Barco Law Library ==
The largest element in the building, the Barco Law Library on floors three, four, and five, serves as the "laboratory" for the work of both students and faculty and is an important information center for practicing lawyers and for scholars from other disciplines. The current collection numbers some 425,000 volumes and volume equivalents and has a seating capacity, in both the individual carrels and in private reading areas, of over 400. The fourth floor is the library's nerve center, containing the circulation desk, the reference desk and reference collection, modern indexing tools, group-study rooms, a microform room, an audiovisual room, and the Harold Obernauer Computerized Legal Research Center. The Obernauer Center, opened in 1987, gives Pitt Law students access to personal computer equipment for research, word processing, and programmed courses of instruction. The fifth floor contains the Derrick A. Bell Constitutional Law Commons which was opened on March 20, 2013. Faculty offices ring the perimeter of the library on floors three and five. The library also contains an art gallery with rotating exhibits. A permanent endowment helps ensure that the school can maintain the quality of the library and respond fully to the teaching and research missions of the law school, as well as to provide a continuing learning resource for practitioners in the law.

=== Classrooms ===
The assembly areas are the next largest element of the building. The facilities are all on the first floor with direct circulation to the main entrance. The spatial arrangements make it possible for the four main classrooms, situated on this floor, to fill and discharge without interference with other activities in the school.

=== Teplitz Memorial Moot Courtroom ===
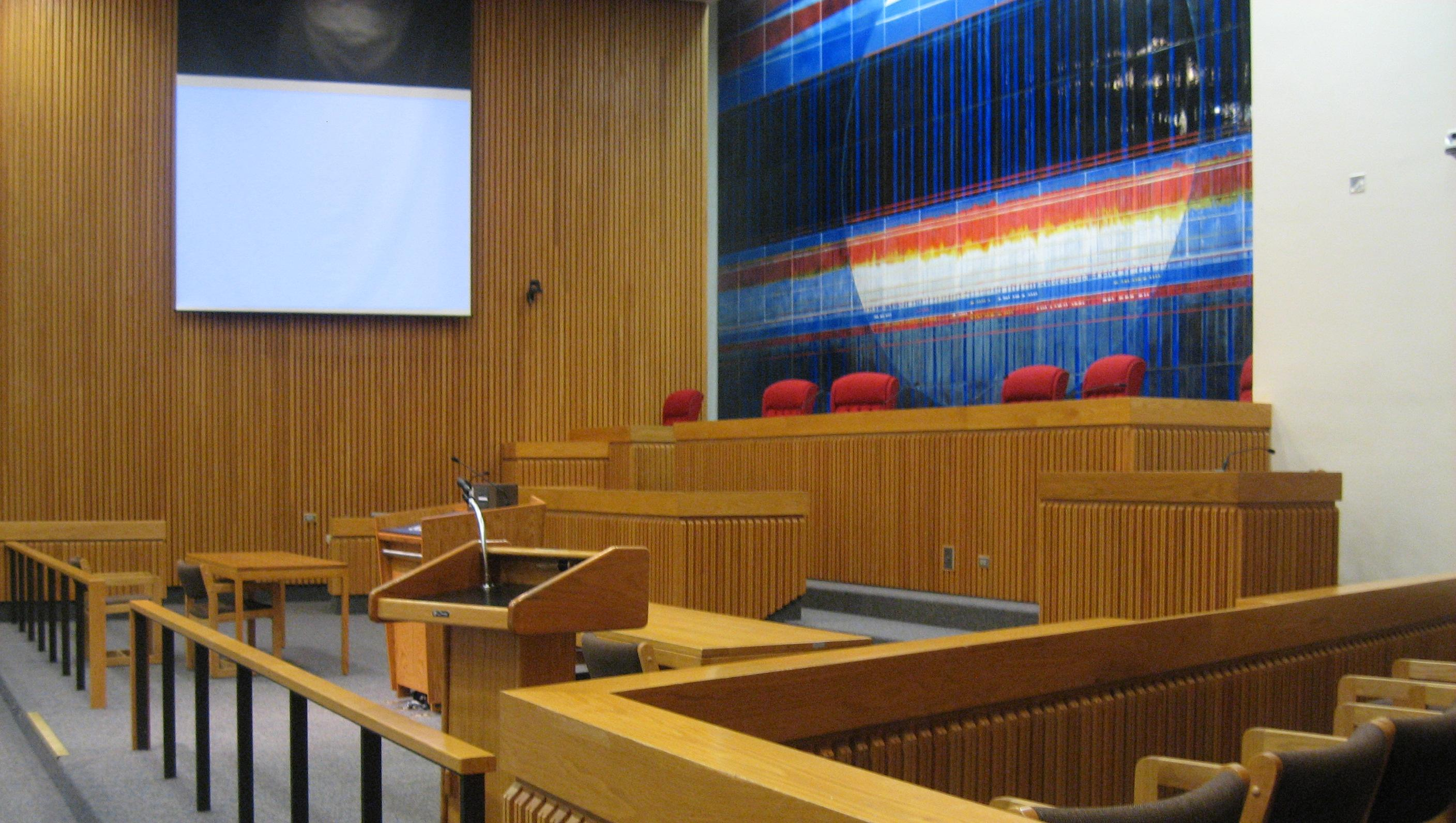
View of the bench and jury box from the gallery area of the Teplitz Memorial Moot Courtroom.

A special feature of the Law Building is the Teplitz Memorial Moot Courtroom on the ground floor. The courtroom, with oak-panelled appointments, is named after the late Benjamin H. Teplitz and includes a seven-seat judges' bench, jury and press boxes, counselors' tables, judges' chambers, and jury room. It is used primarily by trial tactics classes and by the growing number of moot court programs. It is equipped to handle special sessions of the Commonwealth and Federal Appellate Courts and hearings before various administrative tribunals.

A focus of visual interest is the large (24-by-36-foot [7.3 by 11.0 m]) mosaic mounted on the wall behind the judges' bench. Designed and created by the university's Virgil Cantini, the mosaic is a dramatic compound of 126 porcelain-on-steel pieces and represents the artist's conception of the harmony of the law and the rich tapestry of the American legal system. The circle symbolizes the "total process of law." The intersection of the red and blue fields at the top symbolize the opposing sides in a controversy, within the total process of law. The band across the middle of the mural symbolizes a lie detector tape and Morse Code message below read "The truth, the whole truth and nothing but the truth."

=== Lobby ===
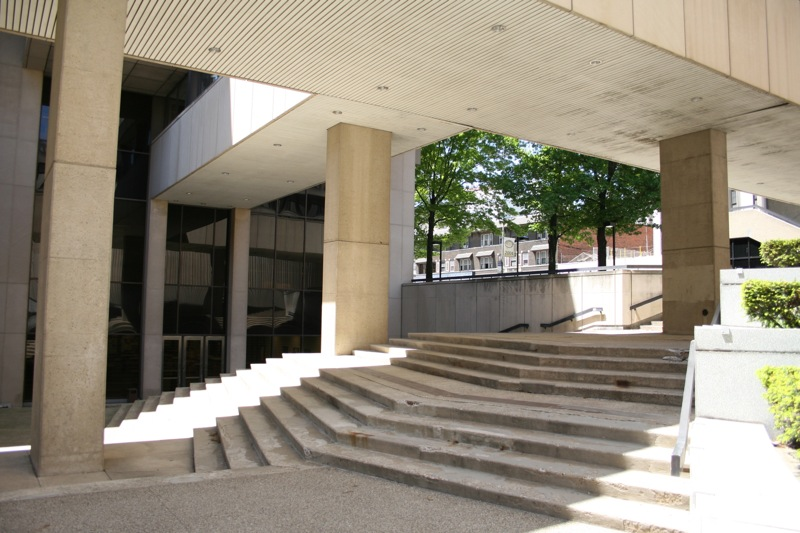
Ground floor entrance

The ground floor of the building is the center for student activity including a large student lounge and vending machine area just off the lounge. The lounge is scheduled to undergo a $1.84 million ($2.7 million today) renovation during 2010–11. Lining the north wall are three student activity rooms designed for more formalized gatherings. On the opposite side of the lounge is the locker area, where each student has an assigned locker. Most of the school's student organizations have offices on the ground floor. Three—the Moot Court Board, the Law Review, and the Journal of Law and Commerce—are located on the fifth floor to afford them easy access to both faculty counselors and the library.

=== William Wallace Booth administrative offices ===
The administrative offices, named in honor of William Wallace Booth, are located on the second floor. The faculty lounge, furbished in part by a grant from the Alcoa Foundation, is adjacent to the administrative suite.

== Gallery ==
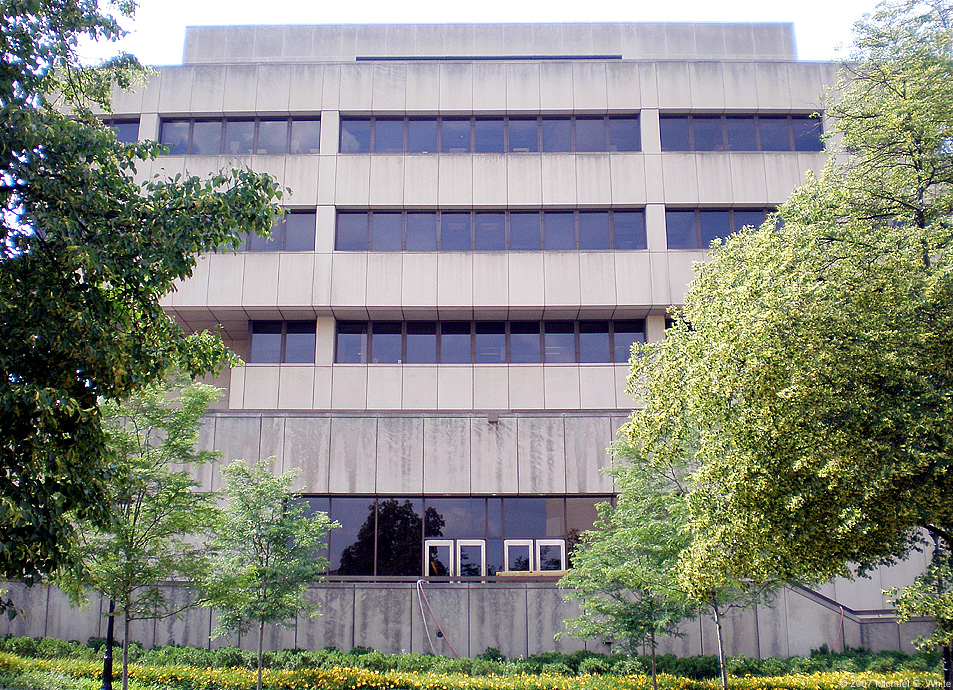
Barco Law building viewed from Forbes Quad

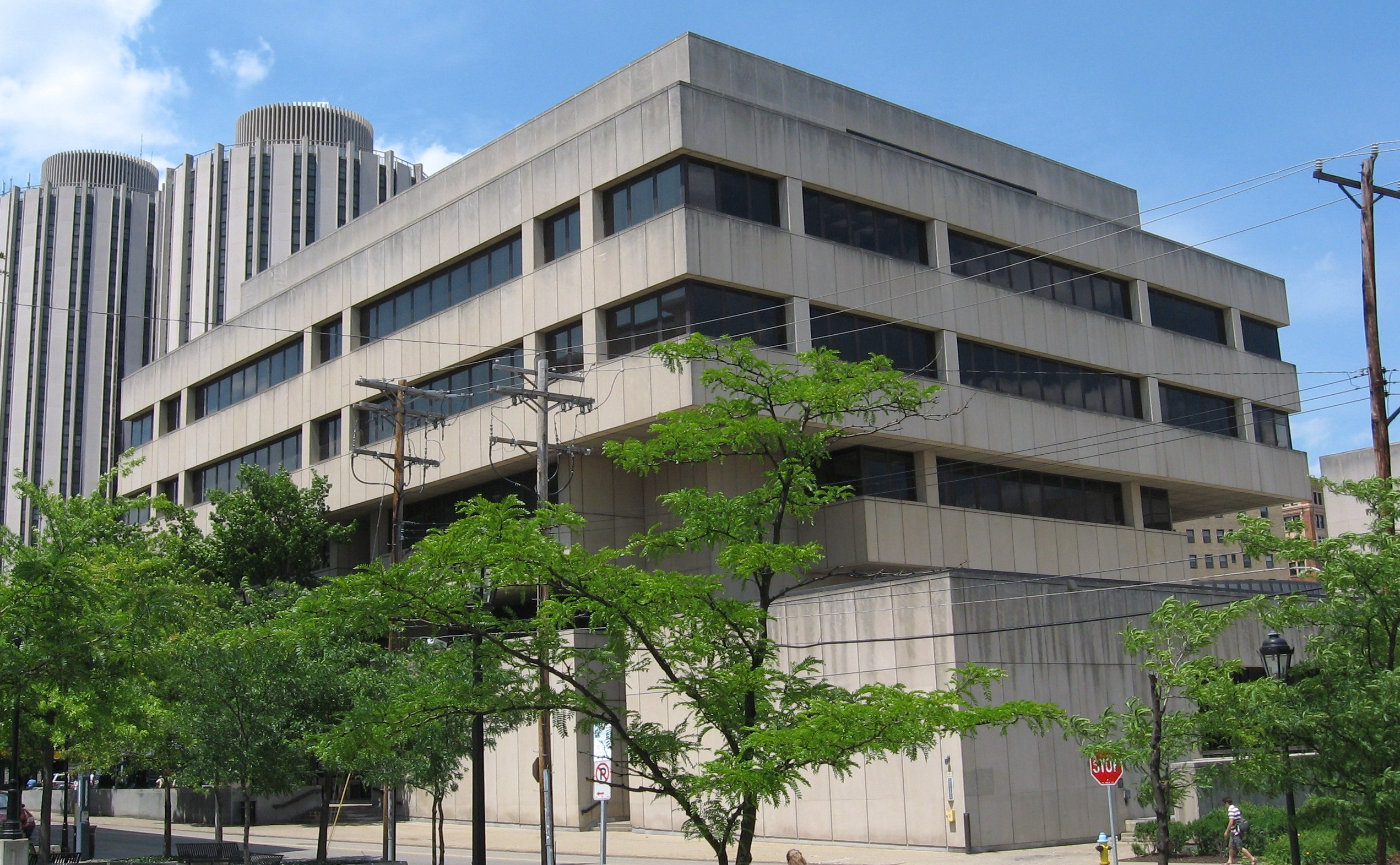

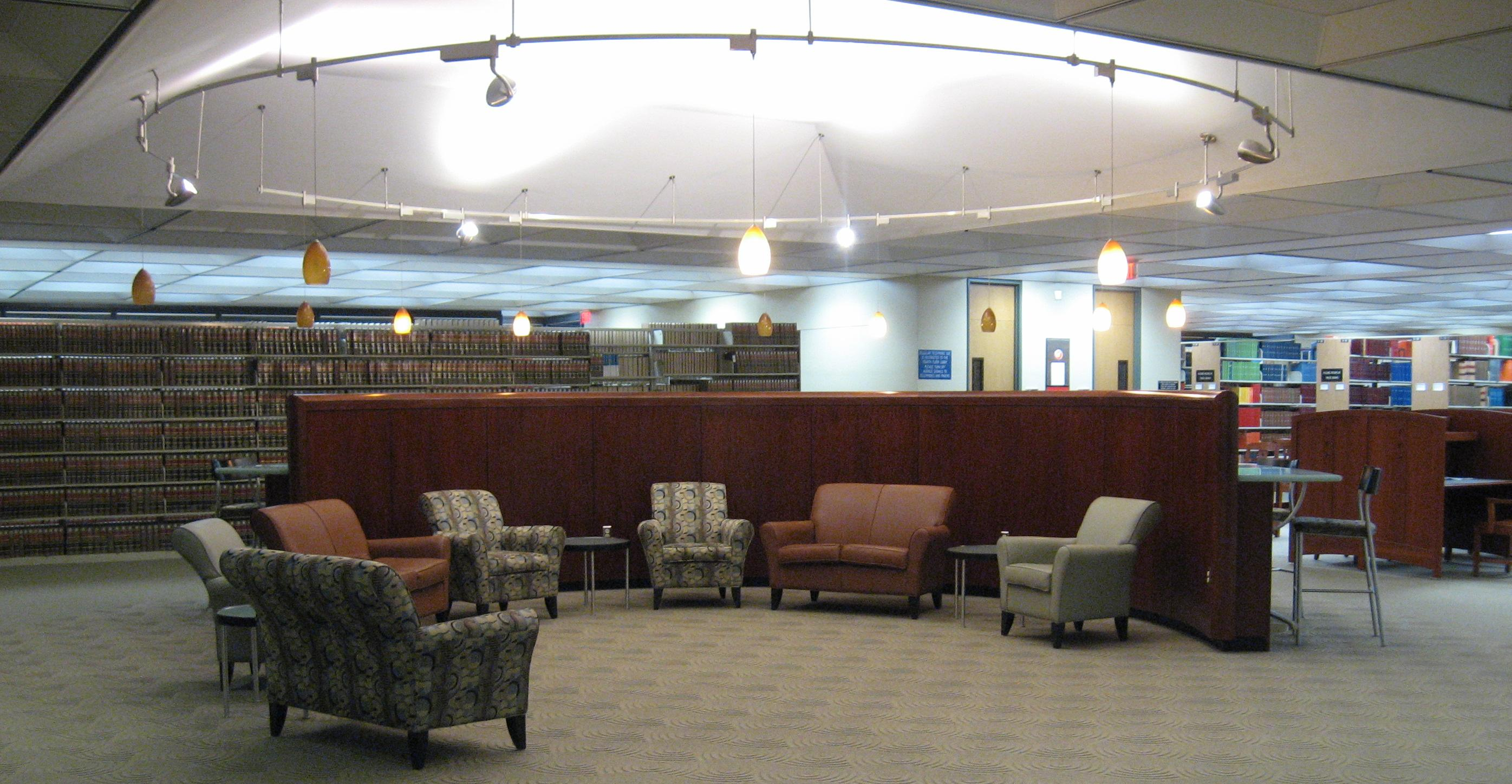
A lounge area on the 5th floor of the Barco Law Library

Preceded by Learning Research and Development Center	University of Pittsburgh buildings Barco Law Building; Constructed: 1976	Succeeded by Posvar Hall
