= Dawne Hickton =

American business executive (born 1957)

- Born: November 2, 1957 (age 68)
- Education: Pitt (Law School) JD (1983)
- Alma mater: University of Rochester (1979)
- Occupations: Business executive Law professor
- Years active: 29+
- Employer: RTI
- Spouse: David Hickton
- Awards: Crohn's & Colitis Foundation

Dawne Eileen Sepanski Hickton (born November 2, 1957) is an American business executive. She is the chief operating officer and president of the aerospace, technology and nuclear businesses of the Jacobs Engineering Group. Before that, she was CEO of Pittsburgh-based RTI International Metals.

Hickton is one of the few women business leaders to manage a large publicly traded firm. In 2011-2012, she pursued numerous acquisitions to grow RTI into an end-to-end supplier of titanium components for clients such as Boeing and Airbus, and for making components for the military aircraft such as the Joint Strike Fighter. She pursued a strategy of buying specialty firms such as Remmele Engineering, the Forming Division of Aeromet, and others as part of a program of vertical integration. In March, 2015, RTI International Metals, Inc. was acquired by Alcoa in a stock-for-stock transaction valued at $1.5 billion.

== Career ==
=== Law beginnings ===
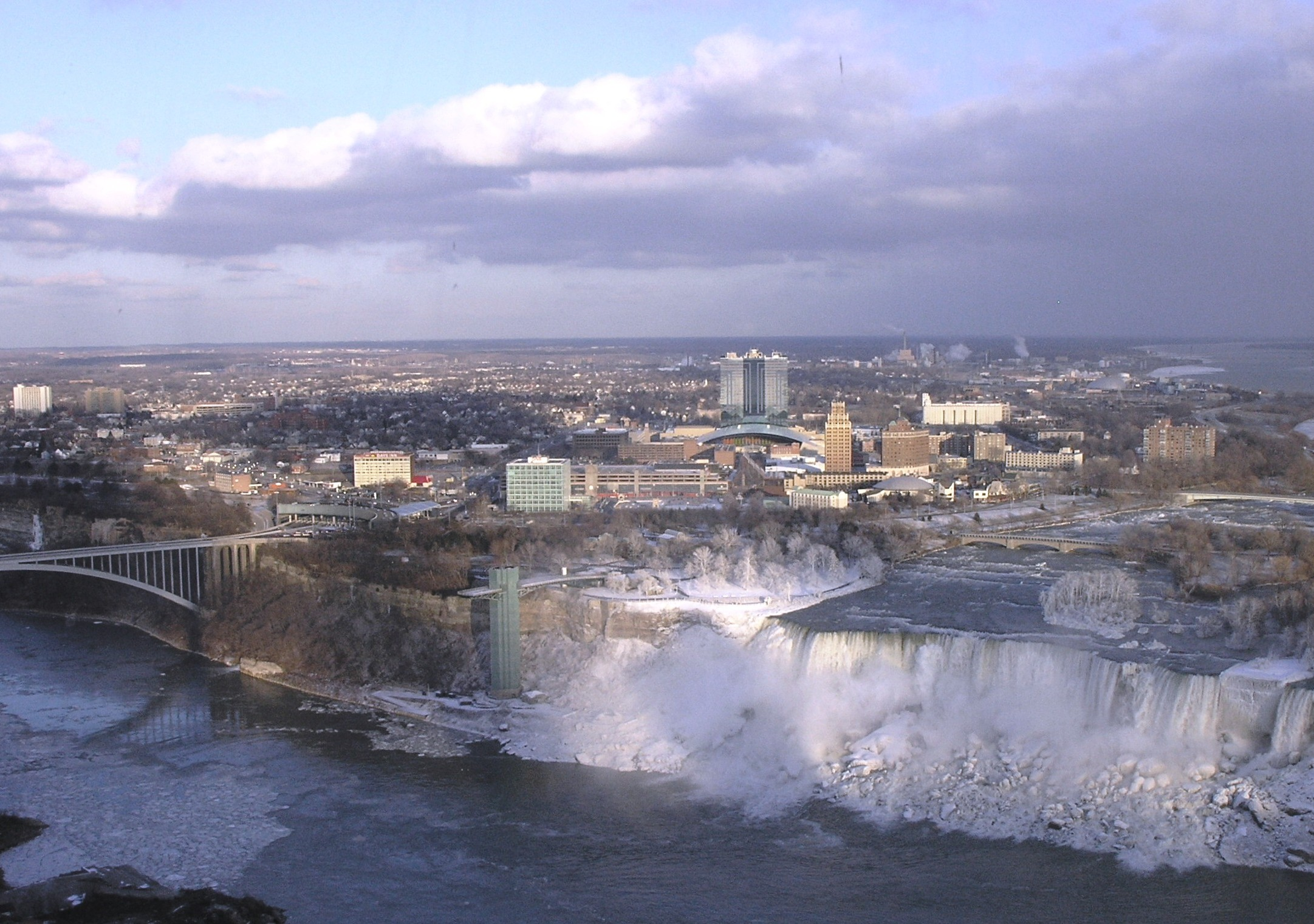
Niagara Falls, New York

Hickton grew up in Niagara Falls, New York. According to one account, she knew from the age of ten that she wanted to be a trial attorney representing corporations in courtrooms. She attended the University of Rochester where she was the homecoming queen and graduated in 1979. She took a year off, and then studied at the law school of the University of Pittsburgh, and graduated in 1983. She worked as a Corporate Trial Attorney at U.S. Steel from 1983 to 1994, and represented the firm before the Equal Employment Advisory Counsel. She was promoted to general attorney of commercial litigation, after winning a billion-dollar lawsuit for the steelmaker. She served as president of the Pitt's chapter of the American Inns of Court. She worked as an assistant professor at the University of Pittsburgh School of Law from 1994 to 1997. She worked at the law firm of Burns, White and Hickton for several years.

=== RTI years ===
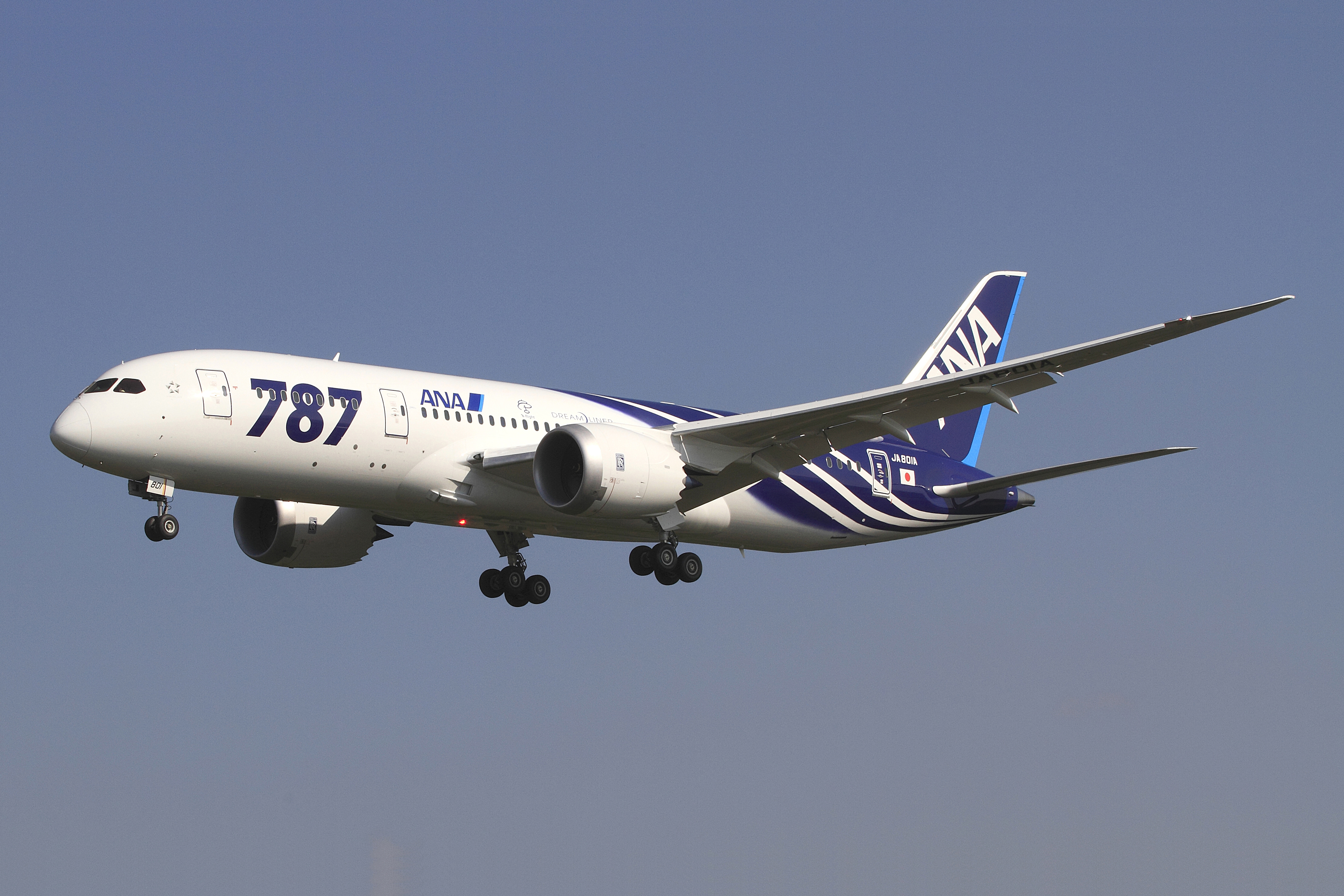
Titanium's light weight and high strength properties make it suitable for tennis racquets and jetliners. Photo: The Boeing 787 Dreamliner in flight.

Hickton joined RTI International Metals in 1997 as vice president and general counsel. RTI specializes in making and processing metals including titanium and steel, and sells specialty metal mill products, extruded shapes, formed parts and engineered systems to many different markets. The firm depends on buying activity in the defense and aerospace industries. It is a cyclical business. She became senior vice president of administration and principal financial officer in 2005. She managed accounting, treasury, tax, business information systems, personnel and legal functions. She was appointed vice chairman and chief executive officer in April 2007.

In 2007, RTI won a $900 million agreement to supply titanium components for the Boeing 787 Dreamliner. During the global downturn beginning about 2008, the company struggled to stay profitable despite weakness in industries which buy titanium and related products such as the commercial aerospace and energy industries, although a reporter described the business as "relatively strong" when then-presidential contender Barack Obama toured an RTI plant in February. Later that year, she moved the firm's headquarters from Ohio to Pittsburgh's western suburbs. She was nominated along with former football Hall of Famer Dan Marino to be a trustee for the University of Pittsburgh. In 2010, RTI provided steel pipe to assist with cleanup efforts for the Gulf Oil spill. Later in the year, the firm was profiled in CNN Money as being one of the 100 fastest-growing companies in the United States.

According to one report, when the congressional supercommittee was trying to find a bipartisan compromise solution to the nation's budget woes, she met with members of the delegation to inform them that "budget uncertainty" was having detrimental effects on her firm's fortunes. Later, in November 2011, after the failure of the supercommittee to act, she criticized political leaders for failing to deal with the nation's "crushing national debt". She wrote:

It is long past time for congressional leaders to stop blaming the "other side" and take action. Kicking the deficit reduction can down the street into the election year ahead is a dangerous strategy.

— Dawne Hickton, 2011, in the Pittsburgh Post-Gazette

As a business executive, she serves on various boards, including the Board of Governors of the Aerospace Industries Association, a director of the International Titanium Association, and a director of the FNB Corporation. She has been a Director of the Federal Reserve Bank of Cleveland since January 2012. She is married and has six children.
