= El Barco Lake =

Lake in Chile

- Laguna El Barco or Lago El Barco
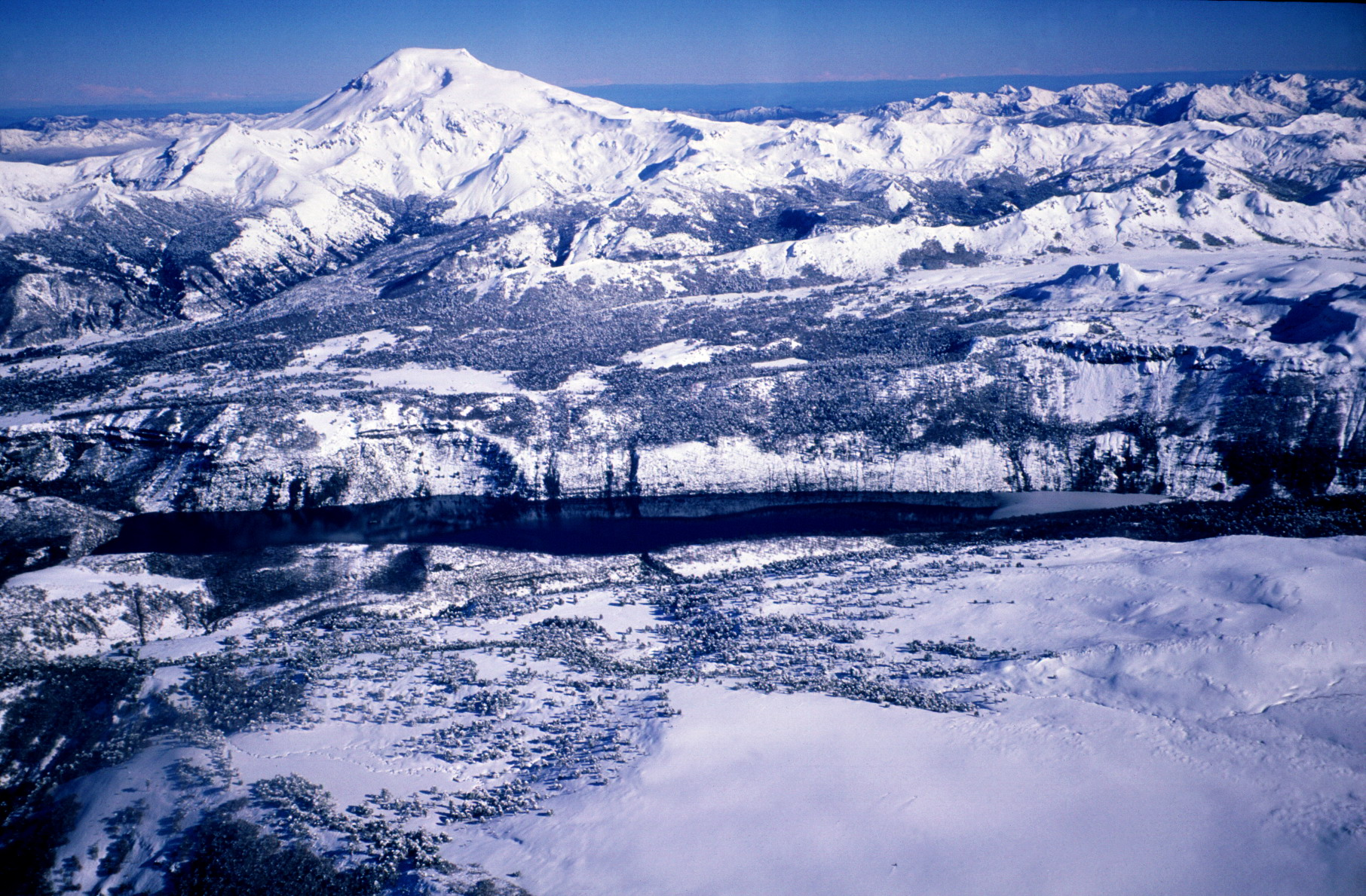
- El Barco Lake, Callaqui in background to the left

- Location within Chile
- Interactive map of El Barco Lake
- Coordinates: 37.929034°S 71.278122°W
- Basin countries: Chile

El Barco Lake (Laguna El Barco or Lago El Barco) is a lake in the Bío Bío Region of Chile, near the Callaqui stratovolcano.

The terrain is volcanic in origin. Ignimbrites and lavas about 2.65 million years old can be seen in the region around the lake.

The lake can be reached by a road that runs up the east side of the Callaqui volcano and the Ralco National Reserve. It has a campsite with hot showers run by the local Pehuenche community, with craft sales, horse riding and MTB rentals. The site is open in summer only, from December to March. In winter there may be as much as 5 metres (16 ft) of snow. In 1997 Endesa proposed to increase exploitation of the tourist potential of the lake and the Río Quillaileo. The first step was to obtain additional financing.
