= Dalim =

German software company

Dalim Software GmbH
- Formerly: Dalim GmbH (1986–1999)
- Company type: Private
- Industry: Software
- Founded: 1986; 39 years ago in Frankfurt, West Germany
- Founder: Francis M. Lamy
- Headquarters: Kehl, Germany
- Products: Dalim Twist; Dalim SE
- Website: www.dalim.com

Dalim Software GmbH, originally Dalim GmbH (previously stylized as DALiM), is a German software company focused on prepress, digital imaging, and digital and print media creation and management. It was founded in 1986 by Francis Lamy in Frankfurt. The company enjoyed a large market share within high-end color houses before faltering in the late 1990s and entering receivership in 1998. In 1999, the company was split three ways, with the majority of Dalim's assets handed to their American reseller Blanchard Systems, who launched Dalim Software GmbH in Germany in the same year.

== History ==
Former logo of Dalim Software

Dalim Software GmbH was founded as Dalim GmbH in Frankfurt, West Germany, by Francis M. Lamy in 1986. Before founding Dalim, Lamy earned a trio of degrees in French universities, including a doctorate of physics at the University of Strasbourg and a master's in mechanical engineering and a bachelor's degree in mathematics from the University of Lyon.

The company's first flagship product was Dalim Litho, an imaging and photo retouching suite aimed at prepress and repro houses. It was introduced in Europe in around 1987 and in the United States in 1989. It ran exclusively on Tektronix's Motorola 88000–based workstations. Major components of Litho were sourced from Digisolve Ltd., a British developer and integrator of CAD/CAM software and workstations. By 1988, Dalim was already a major competitor in the 2D computer graphics market, competing with Genigraphics and Crosfield Electronics, among others.

Tektronix discontinued their workstation lines in the turn of the 1990s, forcing Dalim to transition to Silicon Graphics, Inc. (SGI), workstations for further software development. In 1993, they introduced Dalim Tango, an image editing suite focused on photo retouching, for SGI's IRIX operating system. Around the same time, Dalim also transitioned Litho over from Tektronix to SGI. Litho on SGI was capable of manipulating trap, pagination, color correction and high-resolution photo manipulation.

In late 1994, the company introduced Dalim Twist, a file format converter and batch volume processor for prepress. Twist could convert between Hell, Scitex, Crosfield, and Screen formats and acted as a batch raster image processor for PostScript files and as a server for downconverting high-resolution assets to machines running Dalim software, for the sake of performance in image placement (via the Open Prepress Interface protocol). Both Tango, Litho, and Twist enjoyed a considerable market share within high-end color houses.

Dalim's success in the 1990s proved short-lived, however, and in 1998 the company encountered significant financial difficulty. In December 1998, after a major investor pulled out of the company, Dalim became insolvent and entered receivership in Germany. Their business partner Heidelberger Druckmaschinen, also based in Germany, was rumored to be prepared to acquire Dalim out of bankruptcy; as was Goss Graphic Systems, an American printing press manufacturer based in Westmont, Illinois, who had made a significant investment in Dalim in 1997. Instead, the company was split three ways in early 1999, with the majority of Dalim's assets handed to their American reseller Blanchard Systems, who launched Dalim Software GmbH in Germany in the same year, while other assets were acquired by OneVision Software AG. Following the split, Lamy left the company, joining GretagMacbeth of New Windsor, New York. Since the split, Dalim Software relocated to Kehl, Germany.

As of 2024, Dalim's most popular products include Dalim Twist and Dalim ES, the latter a dashboard and workflow automation suite for printing presses.
