= RTI International Metals =

American titanium manufacturer

- Type: subsidiary
- Industry: Titanium alloy production
- Founded: 1950
- Headquarters: Pittsburgh, United States
- Key people: Dawne Hickton (CEO)
- Products: Titanium sponge; titanium alloy ingot, sheet, strip, billet, plate, tube
- Revenue: US$505.39 million (2006)
- Number of employees: 1,362 (2007)
- Parent: Howmet Aerospace
- Website: www.rtiintl.com (archived July 22, 2015)

RTI International Metals (RMI Titanium Company Inc.(Reactive Metals Inc.), founded in 1950, is a leading US producer of titanium mill products and fabricated metal components for the global market. Through its various subsidiaries, RTI manufactures and distributes titanium and specialty metal mill products, extruded shapes, formed parts and engineered systems for aerospace, industrial, defense, energy, chemical, and consumer applications for customers around the world. The company is commonly referred to simply as RTI. The vice chairman, president, and chief executive officer was Dawne Hickton until 2015.

Its major U.S. operations are based at its Pittsburgh headquarters with facilities in Martinsville, Virginia; Niles, Ohio; Canton, Ohio; Salt Lake City, Utah; Road Spring, Texas; Houston, Texas; Washington, Missouri; Windsor, Connecticut; Garden Grove, California; Indianapolis, Indiana; Sullivan, Missouri; and Montreal, Quebec, Canada. Its overseas operations are located in the United Kingdom, Germany, France, Italy, and China.

In March, 2015, RTI International Metals, Inc. was acquired by Alcoa in a stock-for-stock transaction valued at $1.5 billion.

On Nov 10, 2005, RTI International Metals, Inc. restated its consolidated statement of cash flows for 2004 form 10-K and March 31 and June 30, 2005, Forms 10-Q, due to a newly founded error in the manner in which the company previously classified cash flows from the tax effects of the exercise of employee stock options.

In 2007, the company was ranked 7th on CNNMoney.com's list of the United States' 100 fastest growing companies.

RTI announced plans in 2007 to build a new premium-grade sponge plant contiguous to the Tronox plant in Hamilton, Mississippi. In 2010, RTI announced that it would indefinitely idle its plans to construct the plant in favor of two long-term contracts with Toho Titanium Co., Ltd. and Osaka Titanium Technologies.

RTI International also has a plant in Laval, Quebec called RTI Claro.
