= El Barco, Tucumán =

El Barco (Argentina)
- Municipality and village
- Location within Argentina
- Coordinates: 26.65°S 64.9°W
- Country: Argentina
- Province: Tucumán
- Time zone: UTC−3 (ART)
- Postal code: 4119

El Barco is a village in Tucumán Province in Argentina.
