= Barcial del Barco =

Place in Castile and León, Spain

Coordinates: 41°56′N 5°40′W

Barcial del Barco, Spain
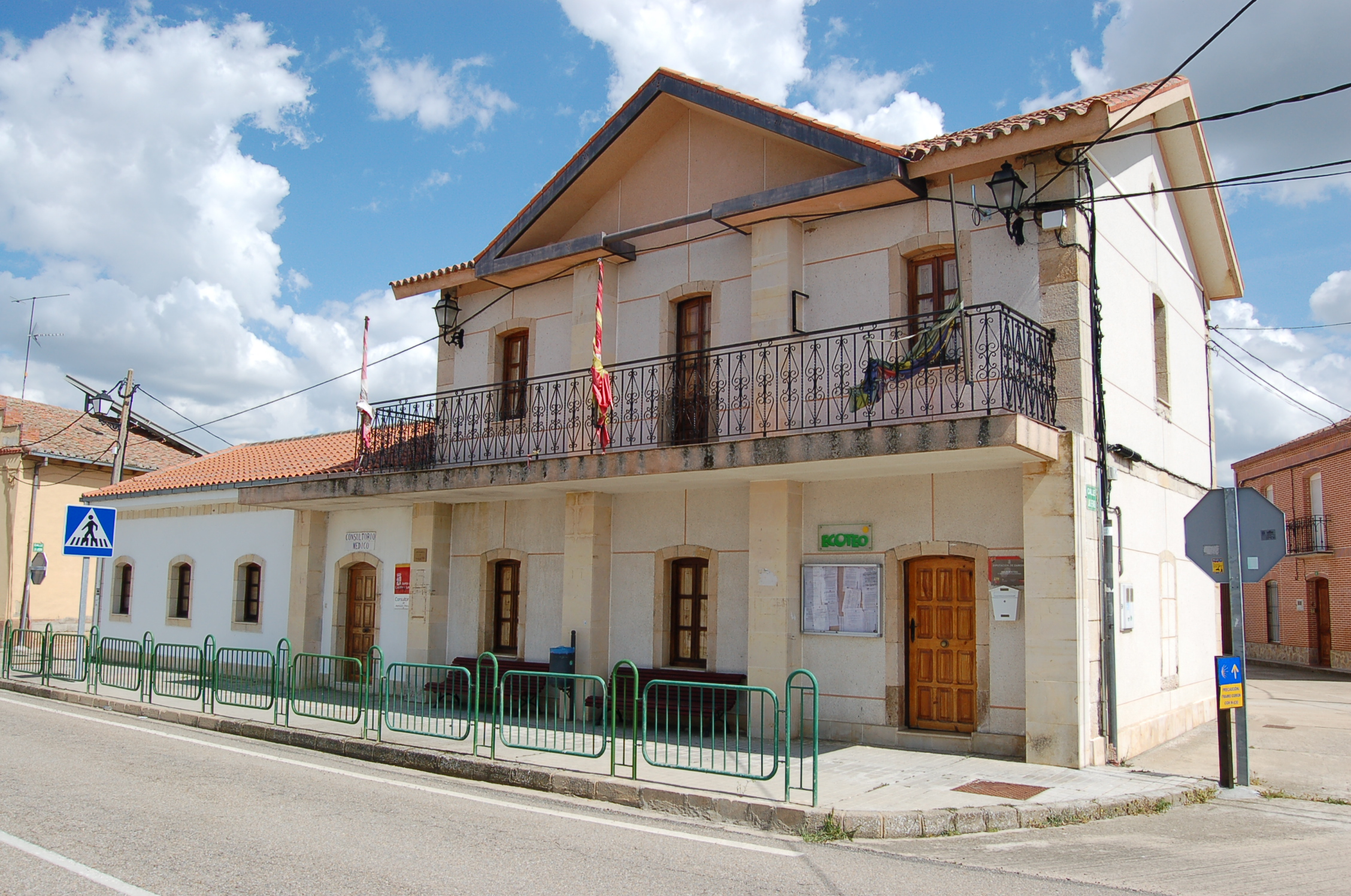
- City Hall

- Flag Coat of arms
- Interactive map of Barcial del Barco, Spain
- Country: Spain
- Autonomous community: Castile and León
- Province: Zamora
- Municipality: Barcial del Barco

Area
  - Total: 19 km^{2} (7.3 sq mi)

Population (2025-01-01)
  - Total: 254
  - Density: 13/km^{2} (35/sq mi)
- Time zone: UTC+1 (CET)
  - Summer (DST): UTC+2 (CEST)
- Website: www.barcialdelbarco.com

Barcial del Barco is a municipality located in the province of Zamora, Castile and León, Spain. According to the 2009 census (INE), the municipality has a population of 280 inhabitants.
