= Nava del Barco =

- municipality
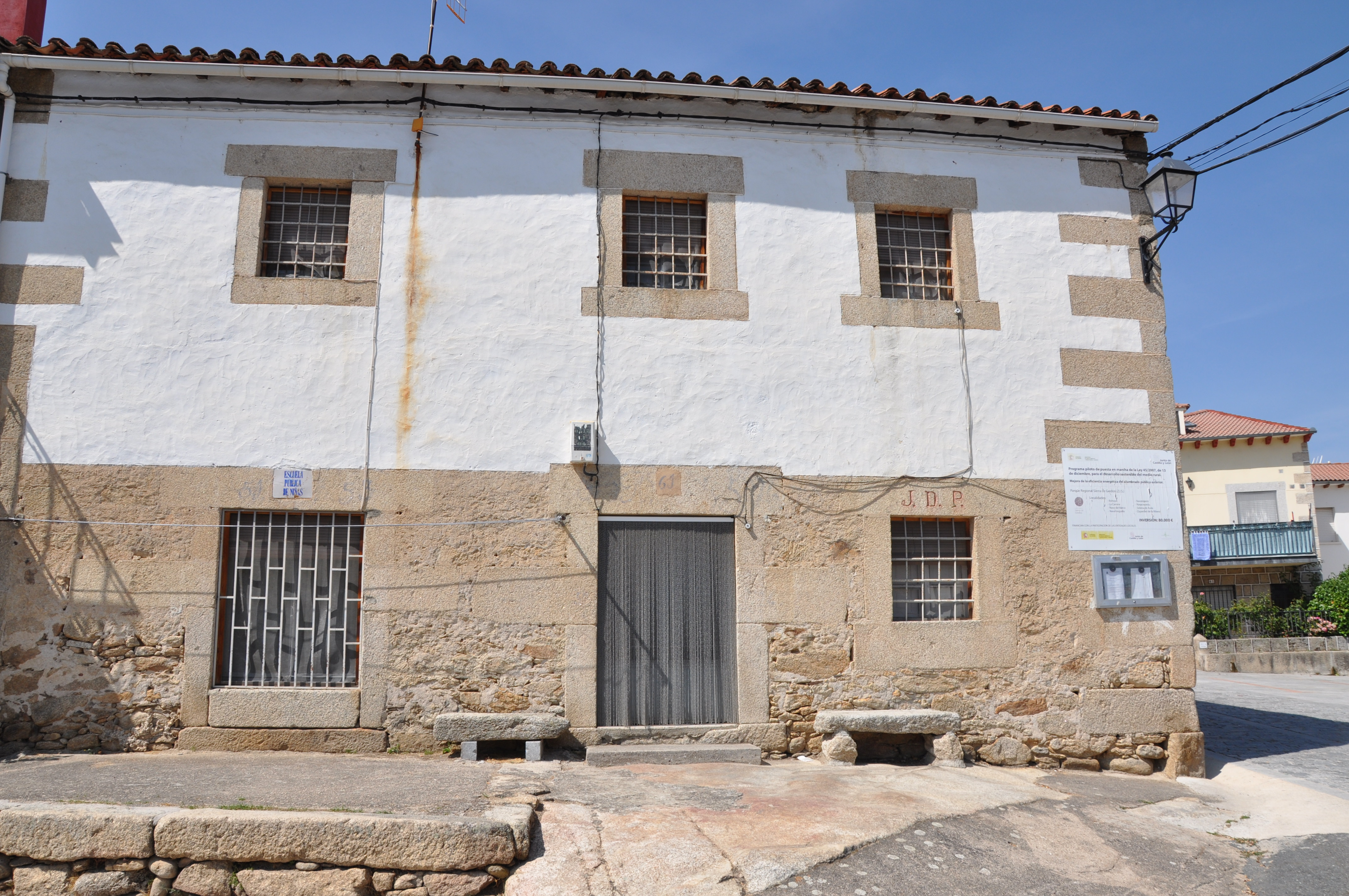
- Old public girls school
- Flag Coat of arms
- Location in Spain. Nava del Barco (Spain)
- Coordinates: 40°17′33″N 5°32′25″W
- Country: Spain
- Autonomous community: Castile and León
- Province: Ávila
- Municipality: Nava del Barco

Area
  - Total: 29 km^{2} (11 sq mi)

Population (2025-01-01)
  - Total: 81
  - Density: 2.8/km^{2} (7.2/sq mi)
- Time zone: UTC+1 (CET)
  - Summer (DST): UTC+2 (CEST)
- Website: Official website

Nava del Barco is a municipality located in the province of Ávila, Castile and León, Spain.

== Population ==
Historical population
Year	Pop.	±% p.a.
2023	85	—
2024	83	−2.35%
2025	81	−2.41%
Source: INE
