= Alias Eclipse =

Eclipse
- Screenshot of Eclipse 3.1.3 on IRIX
- Developers: Form & Vision GmbH
- Stable release: 3.1.4 / August 2001
- Operating system: IRIX, Windows
- Type: 2D computer graphics
- License: Proprietary

Eclipse was a professional 2D image editing program available on Silicon Graphics and Windows workstations. Designed to manipulate high-resolution images like digitized movie frames and photographs for print, it offered color correction tools, image processing effects, rudimentary paint features, and spline-based drawing and masking.

== History ==
Eclipse was originally developed in the late 1980s by Full Color Computing, an early provider of photo retouch and color prepress software for Silicon Graphics workstations. Alias Research (later Alias Systems Corporation), a developer of professional 3D graphics applications for the SGI platform, purchased the rights to Eclipse in fall 1990. Alias developed Eclipse through the early to mid-1990s, releasing version 2.5 in 1995 with improvements to the speed of color correction, effects, and rendering.

Xyvision's Contex Prepress division purchased exclusive rights to Eclipse from Alias in 1996, and released version 3.0 the following year. Eclipse was subsequently sold to German developer Form & Vision GmbH, which continued development and ported it to the Windows platform. In 1999, Form & Vision released a demo of Eclipse 3.1.3 on the SGI platform which was limited to 1600 x 1600 pixel images, then ceased development of Eclipse on the SGI platform. Eclipse was thereafter developed exclusively for the Windows platform, culminating with version 3.1.4 in 2001. In the same year the firm went bankrupt.

== Features ==
Eclipse was designed to work with very large images that could not be manipulated in real time on contemporary computer systems due to memory limitations, and thus allowed the user to make modifications to a lower-resolution copy of the original image in "proxy mode." Brush strokes, color corrections, and other edits were saved in proxy mode, then applied to the full-size image in post processing. This method also allowed for batch processing of a high-resolution image sequence using the edits applied to the original proxy image.

Other features included color correction and separation, warping, special effects, text, and shape masking. Wavelet image compression created by LuraTech was added to Eclipse 3.1.4
