= Yolanda Barco =

American lawyer

Yolanda G. Barco
- Yolanda G. Barco
- Born: March 13, 1926; Meadville, Pennsylvania, U.S.
- Died: May 27, 2000 (aged 74); Meadville, Pennsylvania, U.S.
- Occupations: Lawyer, businesswoman
- Known for: Cable TV pioneer

Yolanda G. Barco (March 13, 1926 – May 27, 2000) was an American lawyer and cable television (CATV) executive who played a key role in development of the cable industry.

== Early years ==
Yolanda Barco was born on March 13, 1926, in Meadville, Pennsylvania, where she would live for the rest of her life. Her father George Barco (born April 11, 1907) was the son of Italian immigrants. Her mother was Emmaline DeLorenzo. George Barco graduated from Meadville High School in 1926, then attended Allegheny College in Meadville while Yolando was an infant, graduating in 1930 with a bachelor of science degree. He then enrolled at the University of Pittsburgh to study law, and on after graduating became assistant district attorney and then deputy attorney general in Pennsylvania, before founding a private law practice. Yolanda Barco also studied at Meadville High School and Allegheny College. She graduated magna cum laude with a degree in economics in 1946. She went on to the University of Pittsburgh law school, graduating in 1949.

== Career ==
Yolanda Barco and her father formed a legal partnership, Barco & Barco. George Barco became interested in television. In 1953 he established Meadville Master Antenna (MMA), a cable TV system, with help from Milton Shapp of Jerrold Electronics. (Note: Milton Shapp later became governor of Pennsylvania.) Yolanda Barco was appointed general manager of the company, and in 1959 was appointed treasurer and executive vice-president. In the early years of cable Meadville Master Antenna was one of the largest systems in the United States. In 1987 MMA merged with Armstrong Communications. Barco became a vice president and director of Armstrong.

In the late 1970s the Barcos teamed with Joey Gans in setting up the non-profit Pennsylvania Educational Communications System (PECS). The purpose was to distribute educational material created at Pennsylvania State University to cable operators around Pennsylvania by way of two microwave relay loops. George Barco was president of the corporation, launched in 1979. It distributed "Pennarama", the first educational cable network in the United States. The eastern loop was completed in 1979, in many cases taking advantage of existing towers, and the western loop in 1982. George Barco died in 1989, and in 1990 Yolanda Barco became president and CEO of PECS. She renamed the corporation the Pennsylvania Cable Network (PCN) and began to reposition it as the state's "educational, public affairs and cultural cable TV network." While still carrying educational material from the university, the network now provided much more material on the Pennsylvania state government and its impact on residents of the state.

From the early 1950s Barco represented the cable TV industry in several important lawsuits. The Barcos launched a test case for the NCTA in Meadville, where they and one of their subscribers, Gus Pahoulis, sued for recovery of $70.40 paid in 1953 and 1954 for the 8% excise tax on cable subscription fees imposed by the Federal Internal Revenue Service. They argued that local cable TV was not a communications service. They lost this case in the district court. However they appealed the decision, and in March 1957 the Third Circuit Court found that CATV is "an aid in reception only", and the excise tax did not apply. An estimated $16 million of tax collected was eligible for refund on application by subscribers.

Yolanda and George Barco played important roles in obtaining the regulatory rulings that allowed cable companies to use three inches of space on utility poles, an achievement of huge value to the industry. In 1972 Yolanda Barco was a member of the advisory committee on the development of regulatory policy of the Federal Communications Commission, one of the four cable industry representatives. In 1985 the Barcos and other cable pioneers established the National Cable Television Museum at Pennsylvania State University. Barco was a director of the National Cable Television Association (NCTA), and director and president of the Pennsylvania Cable Television Association. She was the first woman to receive the cable industry's Vanguard Award for Leadership.

== Public service ==
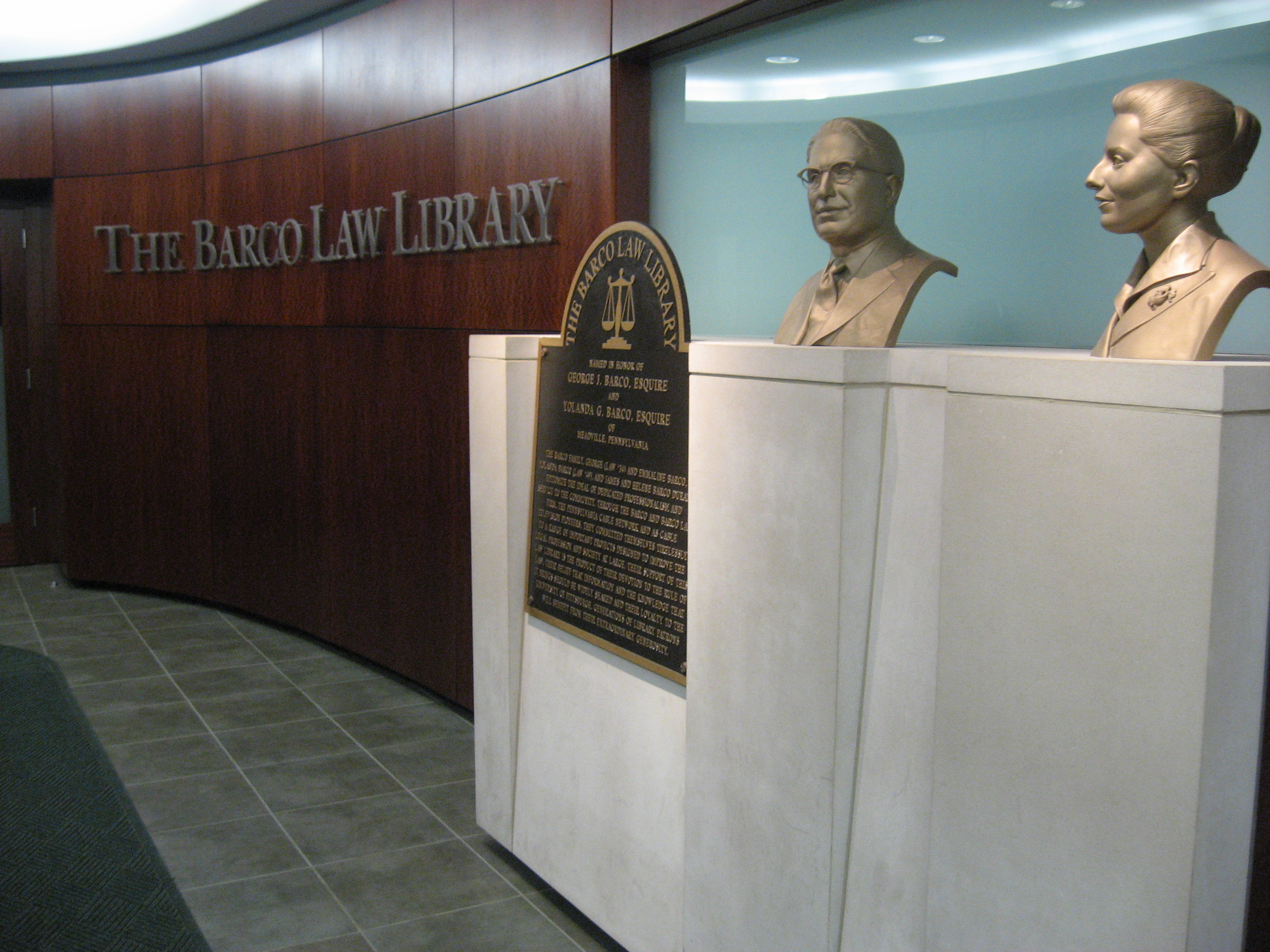
Busts of George and Yolanda Barco in the hall of the Barco Law Building

Yolanda Barco served as deputy mayor of Meadville, Pennsylvania, for four years. She was president of the United Fund of Western Crawford County, chair of the legislative committee of the Meadville Chamber of Commerce and director of the Meadville Library. From February 1990 to June 1997 she was a trustee of the University of Pittsburgh. She and her father made many donations to the university's law school, amounting to $11 million in total.

Yolanda Barco died at her home in Meadville on May 27, 2000, aged 74. Later that year the PCN headquarters were renamed the "PCN Barco Duratz Complex." In June 2003 the University of Pittsburgh law school building was renamed the Barco Law Building in honor of Yolanda and her father. The Oncology Wellness Institute at the Meadville Medical Center was renamed the Yolanda G. Barco Oncology Institute in her honor.
