= George Barco =

American lawyer

George J. Barco
- George J. Barco
- Born: 11 April 1907
- Died: 15 November 1989 (aged 82)
- Occupations: Lawyer, businessman
- Known for: Cable TV pioneer

George J. Barco (11 April 1907 – 15 November 1989) was an American lawyer and cable television (CATV) executive who played a key role in development of the cable industry.

== Early years ==
George Barco was born on 11 April 1907, the son of Italian immigrants. He attended Meadville High School, and before graduating had married Emmaline DeLorenzo and become a father. Emmaline's parents were also Italian, and she had seven siblings. Their first daughter, Yolanda, was born on 13 March 1926 and their second daughter, Helene, was born in 1928. George Barco graduated from Meadville High School in 1926, then attended Allegheny College in Meadville, graduating in 1930 with a Bachelor of Science degree. He then enrolled at the University of Pittsburgh to study law, and joined the Bar in 1934.

== Career ==
George Barco founded Barco and Barco, a legal firm, in Meadville in 1934. Both his daughters would later join him in this business. He became Assistant District Attorney and then Deputy Attorney General in Pennsylvania, before entering private law practice. For fifteen years he was solicitor for the Meadville Area School District.

George Barco became interested in television. In 1953 he established Meadville Master Antenna (MMA), a cable TV system, with help from Milton Shapp of Jerrold Electronics. (Note: Milton Shapp later became governor of Pennsylvania.) He was the first to use aluminum sheath cables, which greatly reduced interference with the signal. As a result, MMA could deliver 12 channels, a huge number at the time. In the early years of cable Meadville Master Antenna was one of the largest systems in the United States. In 1987 MMA merged with Armstrong Communications.

George Barco was one of the founders of the National Community Television Association (NCTA), now the National Cable and Telecommunications Association. He was National Chairman and Vice Chairman of the NCTA, a long-time member of the NCTA board and chairman of various NCTA committees. From 1956 to 1980 Barco was the general legal counsel to the Pennsylvania Community Television Association, now the Broadband Cable Association of Pennsylvania. From 1959 to 1962 he was a member of the first Board of Governors of the Pennsylvania Bar Association. When the Pennsylvania Bar Institute was established in 1965, he became president. To avoid any appearance of conflict of interest, since he was legal counsel to various cable operators, Barco refrained from expanding MMA.

George Barco started to explore the idea of distributing educational programs before 1972. He proposed different channels aimed at young children, high school youth and adults, with the programming supplied by the Pennsylvania Department of Education. There were delays and difficulties, but in the late 1970s the Barcos teamed with Joey Gans in setting up the non-profit Pennsylvania Educational Communications System (PECS). The purpose was to distribute educational material created at Pennsylvania State University to cable operators around Pennsylvania by way of two microwave relay loops. George Barco was president of the corporation, launched in 1979. It distributed "Pennarama", the first educational cable network in the United States. Barco's son-in-law, James J. Duratz, husband of Helene, worked with Joseph S. Gans III to build the network. This involved constructing 22 new microwave towers, as well as linking in 10 existing towers in the eastern loop. The job was done quickly and at very low cost. The eastern loop was operational in 1979 and the western loop in 1982.

George Barco died in November 1989. Emmaline died in January 1999. According to H.F. Lenfest, founder of the CATV network Lenfest Communications, "George was an imposing figure. Very tall, very dynamic, very strong-willed ... George looked very stern - a very commanding presence."

== Achievements ==
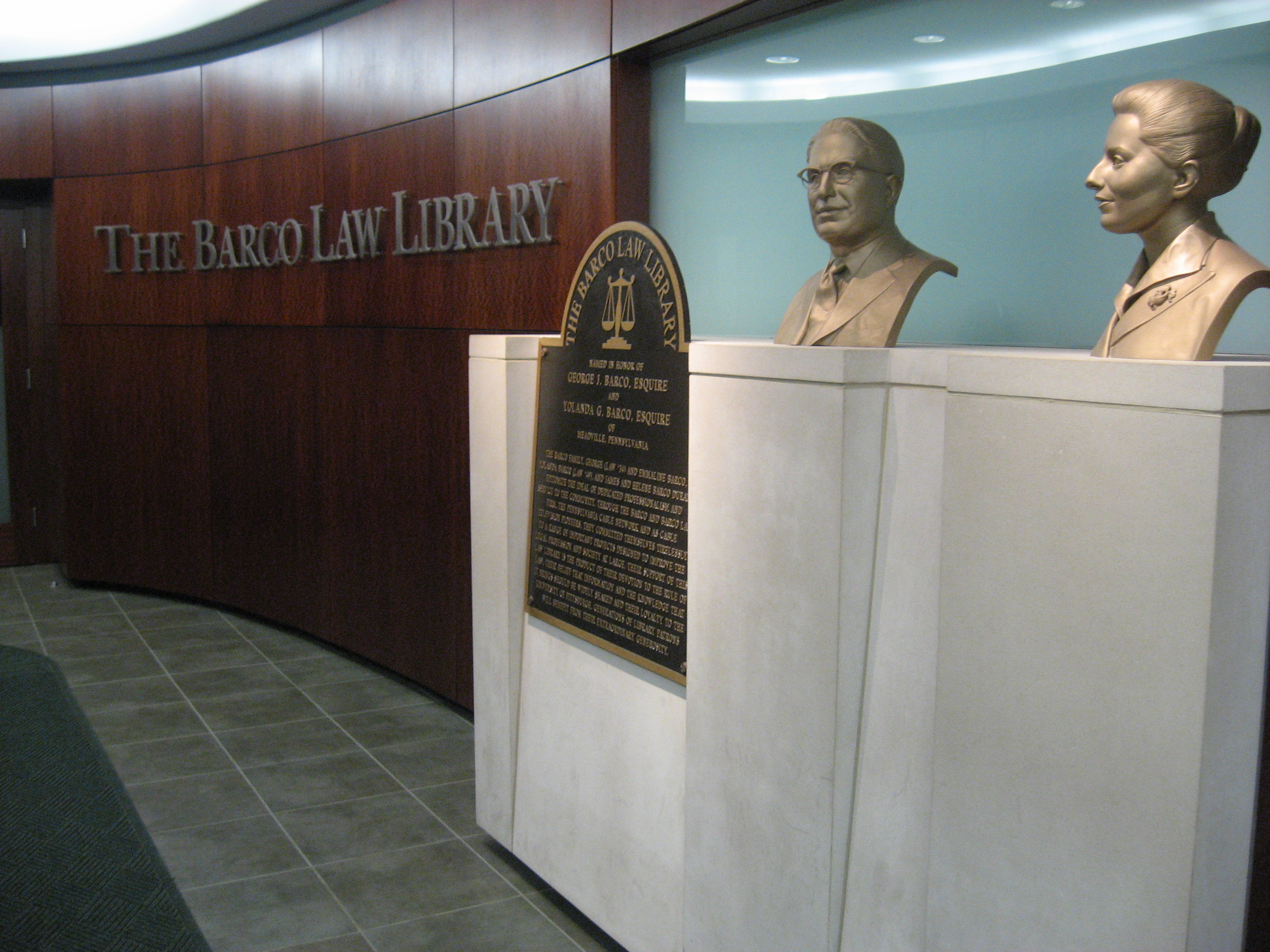
Busts of George and Yolanda Barco in the hall of the Barco Law Building

From the early 1950s George and Yolanda Barco, who had also become a lawyer and worked closely with her father, represented the cable TV industry in several important lawsuits. The Barcos launched a test case for the NCTA in Meadville, where they and one of their subscribers, Gus Pahoulis, sued for recovery of $70.40 paid in 1953 and 1954 for the 8% excise tax on cable subscription fees imposed by the Federal Internal Revenue Service. They argued that local cable TV was not a communications service. They lost this case in the district court. However they appealed the decision, and in March 1957 the Third Circuit Court found that CATV is "an aid in reception only", and the excise tax did not apply. An estimated $16 million of tax collected was eligible for refund on application by subscribers.

George and Yolanda Barco played important roles in obtaining the regulatory rulings that allowed cable companies to use three inches of space on utility poles in exchange for reasonable fees, an achievement of huge value to the industry. The NCTA fought and lost two lawsuits over whether they needed to pay copyright fees when they retransmitted TV programming. In 1962 George Barco argued that since a CATV company simply received broadcast programming and shared it with subscribers, it was not a transmitter. The Supreme Court heard the case and agreed with Barco.

George Barco's will established the Emmaline D. Barco Beautification Fund Trust, which has funded the planting of hundreds of trees in Meadville as well as plantings of bushes, maintenance of city flower beds and other work. The Barco-Duratz Foundation funds educational and literacy programs in the state of Pennsylvania. George and Yolanda Barco made many donations to the University of Pittsburgh School of Law, amounting to $11 million in total. In June 2003 the University of Pittsburgh law school building was renamed the Barco Law Building in their honor.
