= Timeline of Ames Research Center =

As the coalition of Bay Areas counties predicted when it lobbied for the creation of Moffett Federal Airfield in the late 1920s, the base's research program and facilities catalyzed the development of numerous private technology and aerospace corporations, among them Lockheed Martin and the Hiller Aircraft Corporation.

Over the years, the NASA Ames Research Center used its laboratories and wind tunnels to test dozens of propulsion systems and airplane designs.

== 1930s ==
The beginning of a West Coast National Advisory Committee for Aeronautics (NACA) Aeronautical Laboratory

=== 1936 ===
Recommending Moffett Federal Airfield The NACA puts together a special committee on the relationship of NACA to National Defense in time of war, chaired by the Chief of the Army Air Corps, Major General Oscar Westover. Its report, released two years later, called for expanded facilities in the form of a new laboratory—an action underscored by Charles Lindbergh, who had just returned from a European tour warning that Germany clearly surpassed America in military aviation.

The Moffett Federal Airfield area is selected over dozens of competing sites by a federal committee headed by aviator Charles Lindbergh. Centrally located on the West Coast, protected by coastal mountains, next to a large body of water to transport heavy equipment, and with its mammoth, unmistakable Hangar One (Moffett Field, California) visible from the air, Naval Air Station Moffett Federal Airfield already had aircraft runways, good access to electricity and West Coast industrial centers. Stanford University, which had ongoing wind tunnel research with the Navy had a well-regarded aeronautics program, also creating a draw.

A follow-up committee, chaired by Rear Admiral Arthur Cook, chief of the Navy's Bureau of Aeronautics, recommended that the new facility should be located on the West Coast, where it could work closely with the growing aircraft industry in California and Washington.

Following Congressional debate, the NACA received money for expanded facilities at Langley (pacifying the Virginia Congressman who ran the House Appropriations Committee) along with a new laboratory at Moffett Federal Airfield.

=== 1939 ===
August, NACA Charles Lindbergh Committee Established by Congress to evaluate the sites to build the west's NACA Aeronautical Laboratory

September 1, German planes, tanks, and troops invade Poland. and World War II begins.

October, 62 Acres adjacent to NAS Moffett Field are selected for an Aeronautical Laboratory

December 20, Ground is broken for the new aeronautical center

Under the leadership of director Smith De France, researchers came to this NACA Laboratory for more freedom to pursue new ideas. The resulting facility has been on the cutting edge of aeronautics research ever since.

== 1940s ==
- De-icing
- Conical Chamber
- Wind Tunnels
- Flight Research
- Swept wing
- Transonic Theory

=== 1940 ===
The NACA site at Moffett Federal Airfield becomes the Ames Aeronautical Laboratory, in honor of Dr. Joseph Ames, charter member of the NACA and its longtime chairman.

Key personnel for the new laboratory came from Langley, and the junior lab tended to defer to Langley for some time.

=== 1941 ===
7 December, The Japanese Attack Pearl Harbor Attack

=== 1945 ===
14 & 15 August End of World War II in Asia occurs, when armed forces of Japan surrendered to the forces of the Allied Powers

After World War II After several years of managing their own wartime projects, the Ames laboratory felt less like an adolescent and more like a peer of Langley. The NACA, like NASA after it, became a family of labs, but with strong individual rivalries.

The Ames Aeronautical Laboratory at end of the war has 11 Navy aircraft, including the Ryan FR-1 Fireball, were assigned to the facility.

== 1950s ==
- Flight simulators
- Arc Jets
- Blunt Body ReEntry Vehicle Concept
- Hyper-velocity Free Flight

=== 1950 ===
Building the Unitary Plan Wind Tunnel Complex At a cost of $32 million, construction of the Unitary Plan Wind Tunnel at Ames began in 1950-1951 and continued until 1955.

Because no one wind tunnel could meet all the demands for additional research facilities simulating the entire range of aircraft and missile flight, NACA chose to build the Ames tunnel with three separate test sections drawing power from a common centralized power plant.

The Transonic test section spanned 11 by 11 feet, while the two Subsonic sections were smaller: nine by seven feet and eight by seven feet. Giant valves 20 feet in diameter supplied air from one supersonic leg to another.

=== 1955 ===
The Unitary Plan Wind Tunnel Complex opens. The American West Coast aircraft industry quickly capitalizes on the new research facility.

Famed Boeing fleet of commercial transports and the Douglas DC-8, DC-9, and DC-10 were all tested here; as well as military aircraft such as the F-111 fighter, the C-5A transport and the B-1 bomber.

Unitary Plan Wind Tunnel Complex facts: The site Covers 11 Acres, the basic design integrates and embodies three test sections for different speeds so that a single model can be tested over the entire speed range from Mach 0.40 to Mach 3.45

=== 1958 ===
Congress creates NASA with the National Aeronautics and Space Act The NACA Ames Aeronautical Laboratory was renamed NASA Ames Research Center and became a NASA field center.

== 1960s ==
- Lifting body
- Project Mercury, Project Gemini, & Apollo Program Heat shield Tests
- Apollo Program Guidance system
- Apollo Program Re-Entry Shape
- Tektites
- Space Life Science

=== 1961 ===
May 25, John F. Kennedy's Speech The Decision to Go to the Moon: speech before a Joint Session of Congress

Unitary Plan Wind Tunnel Complex 1960s and 1970s almost all NASA crewed space vehicles including the Space Shuttle are tested in the Ames Unitary Plan Wind Tunnel complex.

== 1970s ==
- Pioneer program to Venus John D. Mihalov
- Pioneer programs 10 & 11 John D. Mihalov
- Computational Fluid Dynamics
- Kuiper Airborne Observatory
- Viking program Biological Lab
- Tilt-rotor

== 1980s ==
- Galileo Probe John D. Mihalov
- Supercomputers
- Air Transportation Systems
- 80x120 Foot Wind Tunnel
- ER-2

=== 1985 ===
The Unitary Plan Wind Tunnel complex was nominated and accepted by the Department of Interior as a National Historic Landmark

The wind tunnel complex assets are divided as follows:

- Wind Tunnels (4)
- Engine Development (3)
- Rocket Engine Test Stands (3)
- Rocket Test Facility (1)
- Rocket (1)
- Launch Pads (1)
- Apollo Training Facilities (4)
- Apollo Hardware Test Facility (1)
- Unmanned Spacecraft Test Facilities (3)
- Tracking Station (1)
- Mission Control Centers (2)
- Other Support Facility (1)

=== 1987 ===
The Transonic Wind Tunnel Complex expands to 80 by 120 feet and the power of its huge fans was nearly quadrupled.

== 1990s ==
- X-36
- Human-centered computing
- Education
- Lunar Prospector
- NASA Research Park
- Astrobiology

=== 1991 ===
Post-Cold War defense cutbacks and related Base Realignment and Closure (BRAC) actions in the 1990s identified NAS Moffett Field for closure.

=== 1994 ===
July 1 NASA Ames Research Center (ARC), assumed control of the NAS Moffett Field facility. The NAS Moffett Federal Airfield name was changed to NASA Research Park (NRP), and the Moffett Federal Airfield (MFA).

Supervision of Moffett Federal Airfield's two runways, three aircraft hangars, and 3.5 million square feet of facilities was turned over to the NASA Ames Research Center.

As the new federal custodian, NASA Ames operates the shared facility in the heart of "Silicon Valley" at the southern end of San Francisco Bay and serves as host to a number of other federal, civilian, and military resident agencies.

=== 1996 ===
May The American Society of Mechanical Engineers dedicated the Unitary Plan Wind Tunnel complex as an International Historic Mechanical Engineering Landmark.

=== 1997 ===
April 30, The Universities Space Research Association (USRA) purchases the aircraft for use as the Sofia Airborne Observatory

October 27, NASA purchased the aircraft from the USRA

=== 1998 ===
Moffett Federal Airfield - Naval Base Realignment and Closure (BRAC) Toxic Remediation started.

== 2000s ==
- Planetary Science
- Kepler program
- Nanotechnology
- LCross
- NASA Lunar Science Institute
- Pleiades supercomputer

=== 2004 ===
November, Columbia supercomputer debuted as the second most powerful supercomputer on the TOP500 list.

=== 2007 ===
April 26, Sofia Airborne Observatory Maiden flight

=== 2009 ===
December 18, Sofia Airborne Observatory performs the first test flight in which the telescope door was fully opened. This phase lasted for two minutes of the 79-minute flight.

=== 2008 ===
The NASA Ames Research Center leases 42 acres between the research center and San Francisco Bay to Google, Inc.

== 2010s ==
=== 2010 ===
May 26, Sofia Airborne Observatory's telescope saw first light, returning images showing M82's core and heat from Jupiter's formation escaping through its cloud cover. December, Initial "routine" Sofia Airborne Observatory science flights begin.

=== 2013 ===
Google begins building a 1.1 million square foot office complex consisting of nine buildings overlooking San Francisco Bay dubbed "Bay View." The buildings are to be the new headquarters for Google and will be part of the nearby Googleplex.
