= Henry McDonald =

Henry McDonald may refer to:

- Henry McDonald (American football) (1890–1976), American football player
- Henry McDonald (engineer), professor of engineering
- Henry McDonald (writer) (c. 1965–2023), Northern Irish writer and journalist
- Hank McDonald (Henry Monroe McDonald, 1911–1982), Major League Baseball pitcher
- Henry P. McDonald, architect

== See also ==
- Henry MacDonald (1823–1893), Scottish recipient of the VC
- Harry McDonald (disambiguation)
