= Harry MacDonald =

Harry MacDonald may refer to:

- Harry MacDonald (racing driver) (born 1940), retired American racecar driver
- Harry MacDonald (cricketer) (1861–1936), English cricketer

== See also ==
- Harry McDonald (disambiguation)
- Henry MacDonald (1823–1893), Scottish recipient of the Victoria Cross
- Harold MacDonald (disambiguation)
