= Unitary Plan Wind Tunnel (Mountain View, California) =

NASA facility

- U.S. National Register of Historic Places
- U.S. National Historic Landmark
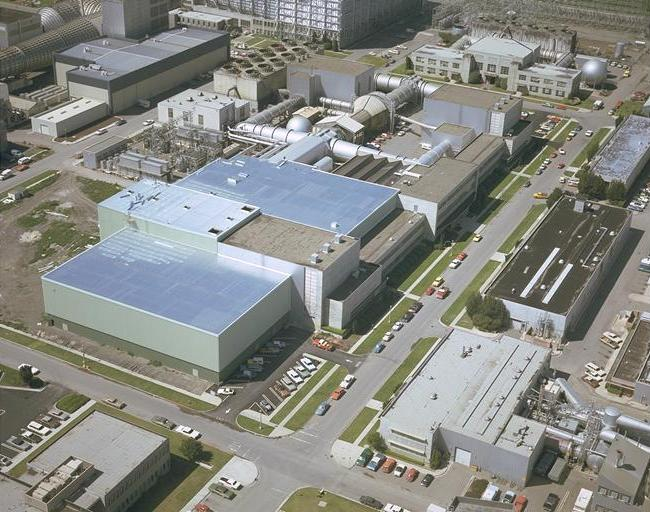
- Aerial view of the Unitary Plan Wind Tunnel complex, 1974

- Location within San Jose, California Location within California Location within the United States
- Location: Mountain View, California
- Coordinates: 37°25′0.9″N 122°3′37.71″W
- Built: 1955
- NRHP reference No.: 85002799

Significant dates
- Added to NRHP: October 3, 1985
- Designated NHL: October 3, 1985

The Unitary Plan Wind Tunnel, located at the NASA Ames Research Center in Moffett Federal Airfield, Mountain View, California, United States, is a research facility used extensively to design and test new generations of aircraft, both commercial and military, as well as NASA space vehicles, including the Space Shuttle. The facility was completed in 1955 and is one of five facilities created after the 1949 Unitary Plan Act supporting aeronautics research.

== Background ==
After the construction of the Variable Density Tunnel at Langley in 1921, the National Advisory Committee for Aeronautics built a variety of technical research facilities upon which the American aircraft industry was based. These facilities enabled the American aircraft industry to dominate the skies in both commercial and military aviation. By 1945, America's lead in the field of aviation seemed to be evaporating. The technological achievements of the German missiles and jet aircraft indicated a lag in American aeronautical research.

In 1949, Congress passed the Unitary Plan Act, under which the Federal government coordinated a national plan of facility construction encompassing NACA, as well as the Air Force, private industry, and universities. The Unitary Plan resulted in the construction of a new series of wind tunnel complexes to support the American aircraft industry, including the Ames Unitary Plan Wind Tunnel Complex.

== Construction ==
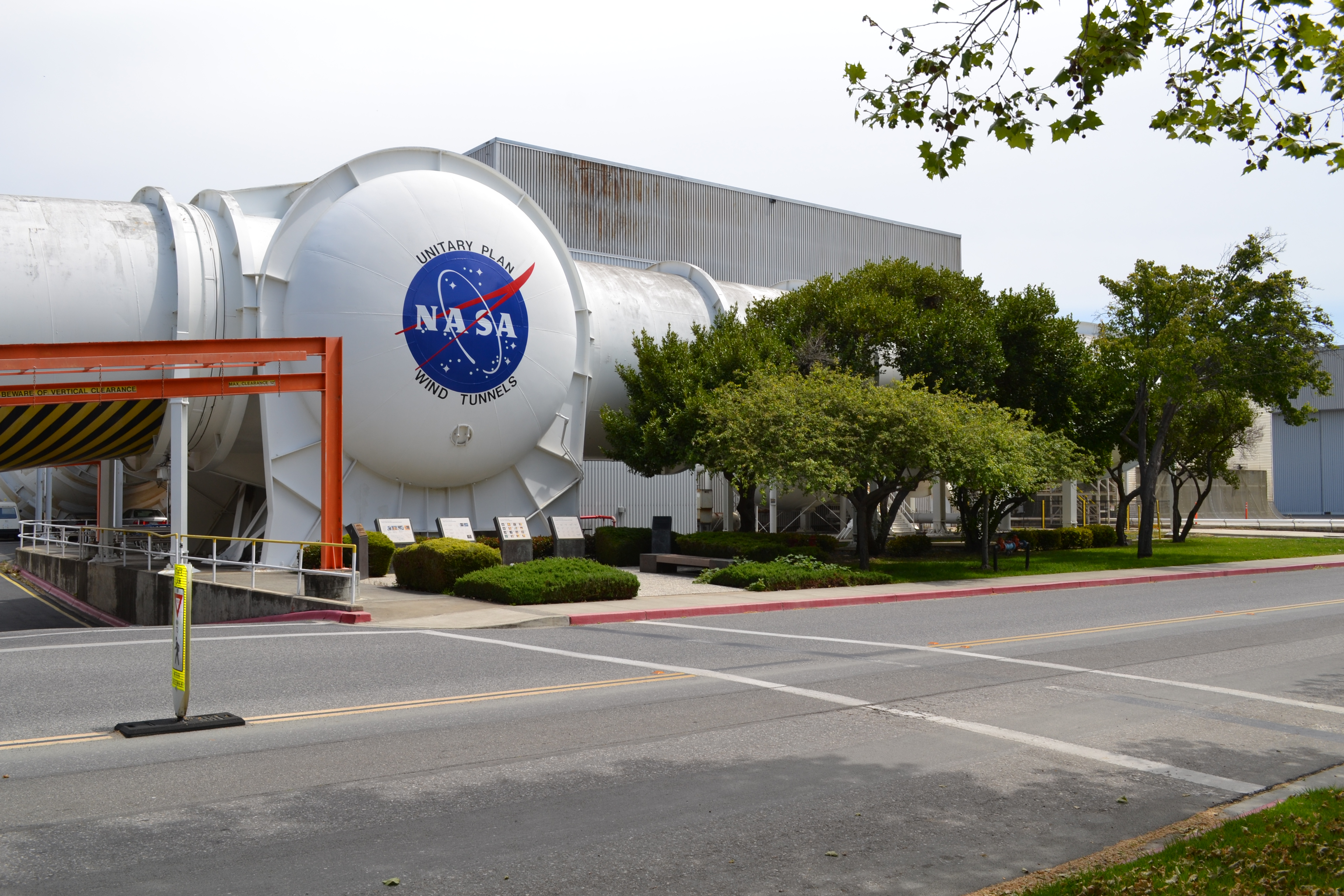
Portion of the Unitary Plan Wind Tunnel in 2014

Construction of this facility began in 1950-1951 and continued until 1955. Because no one wind tunnel could meet all the demands for additional research facilities simulating the entire range of aircraft and missile flight, NACA chose to build the Ames tunnel with three separate test sections drawing power from a common centralized power plant. The transonic test section spanned 11 by 11 feet (3.3 x 3.3 m), while the two supersonic sections were smaller: nine by seven feet (2.7 x 2.1 m) and eight by seven feet (2.4 x 2.1 m). Giant valves 20 feet (6 m) in diameter supplied air from one supersonic leg to another.

The Unitary Plan Wind Tunnel has three closed-loop wind tunnels, each with its own model test section, but all sharing the same drive motors. The drive motors power compressors to propel the air within the wind tunnel circuit. Because of this shared layout, only one UPWT test section can be used at a time. The three wind tunnels that are part of this system are:

- 11-by 11-foot Transonic Test Section. A closed-return, variable-density tunnel with a fixed-geometry, ventilated test section with a flexible wall nozzle with a Mach range of 0.20 to 1.45.
- 9-by 7-foot Supersonic Test Section. A closed circuit, single return, variable density, continuous flow wind tunnel with a Mach range of 1.55 to 2.55.
- 8-by 7-foot Supersonic Test Section. A closed circuit, single return, variable density, continuous flow wind tunnel with a Mach range of 2.55 to 3.5. (The 8x7 was decommissioned in the early 90's and is considered "mothballed").

The Unitary Plan Wind Tunnel was declared a National Historic Landmark in 1985.

== History ==
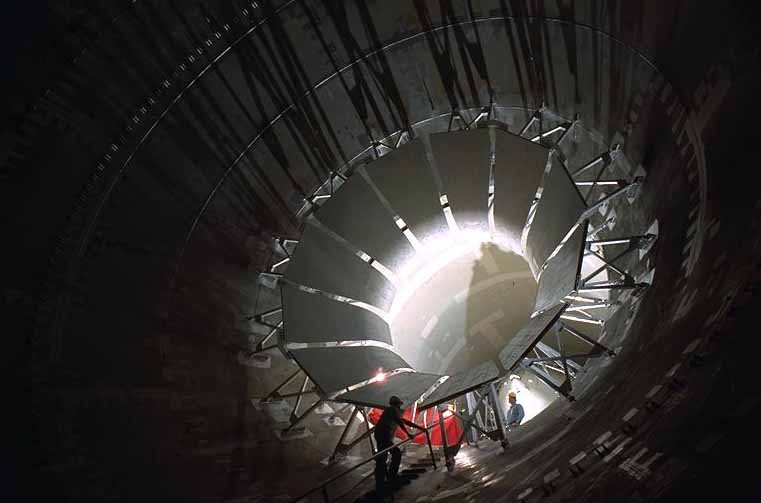
Crew working on the diffuser and contraction vanes, 1996

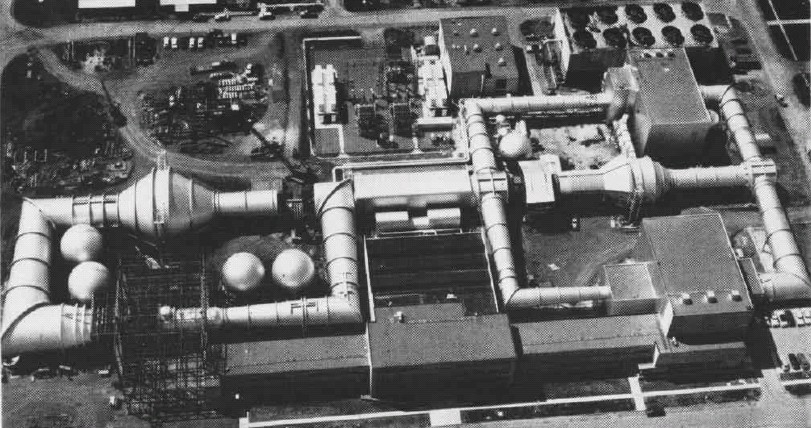
Aerial view of the Wind Tunnel with construction going on in the mid-1950s

The American West Coast aircraft industry quickly capitalized on the Ames Unitary Plan Wind Tunnel Complex. The famed Boeing fleet of commercial transports and the Douglas DC-8, DC-9, and DC-10 were all tested here; as well as military aircraft such as the F-111 fighter, the C-5A Galaxy transport and the B-1 Lancer bomber. In addition to aircraft, in the 1960s and 1970s all NASA crewed space vehicles including the Space Shuttle and SLS have been tested in the Ames Unitary Plan Wind tunnel complex.

== Drive system ==
The major element of the tunnel complex is its main drive system. The main drive consists of four wound-rotor-type induction electric motors connected in tandem. Each motor is rated to produce up to 65,000 Horsepower and 7200 volts. Combined, the main drive system can produce up to 260,000 horsepower. Drive speed is currently controlled by a liquid rheostat system.

== 11ft transonic wind tunnel ==
The Transonic wind tunnel is a closed-return, variable density tunnel with a fixed test section geometry. The 11-ft is capable of speeds from Mach 0.25 to Mach 1.4. Airflow is produced by a three-stage, axial-flow compressor. Supersonic conditions are achieved by moving a symmetric flexible wall in a nozzle configuration.

Typical models in the 11-ft are either a full span (sting mounted), or half span (floor mounted) configuration.

A sting-mounted model support is capable of moving the test article to various AOA and AOS setpoints within a 15 degree cone.

Typical model measurements acquired may include: Forces and Moments, Steady-State Pressures, Temperatures.

Multiple optical test techniques are offered which include: Shadowgraph (which is closely related to Schlieren), Infrared Thermography, Model Deformation and Pressure-sensitive paint.

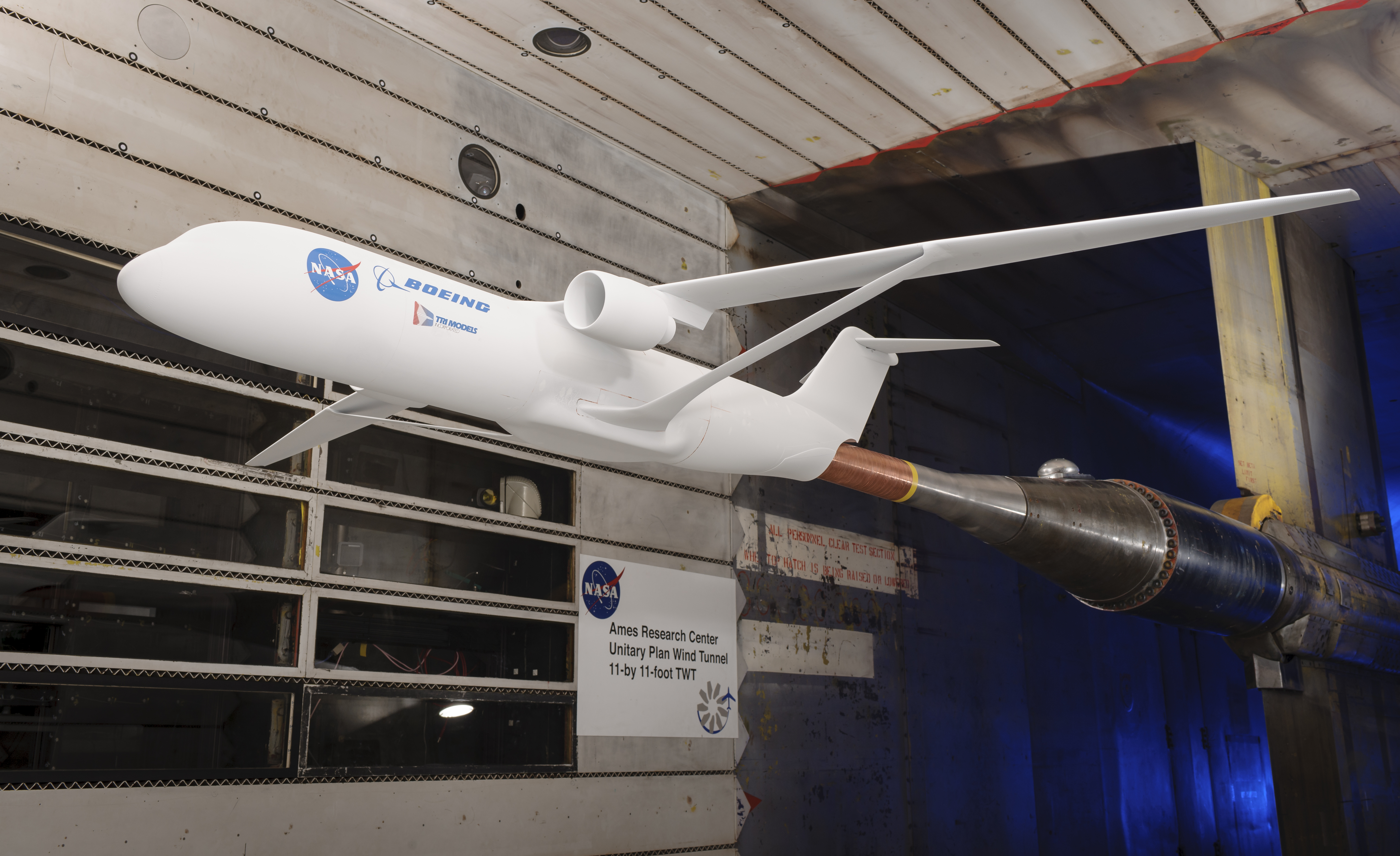
SUGAR/ TBW Full-Span Model in the UPWT 11-ft Test Section

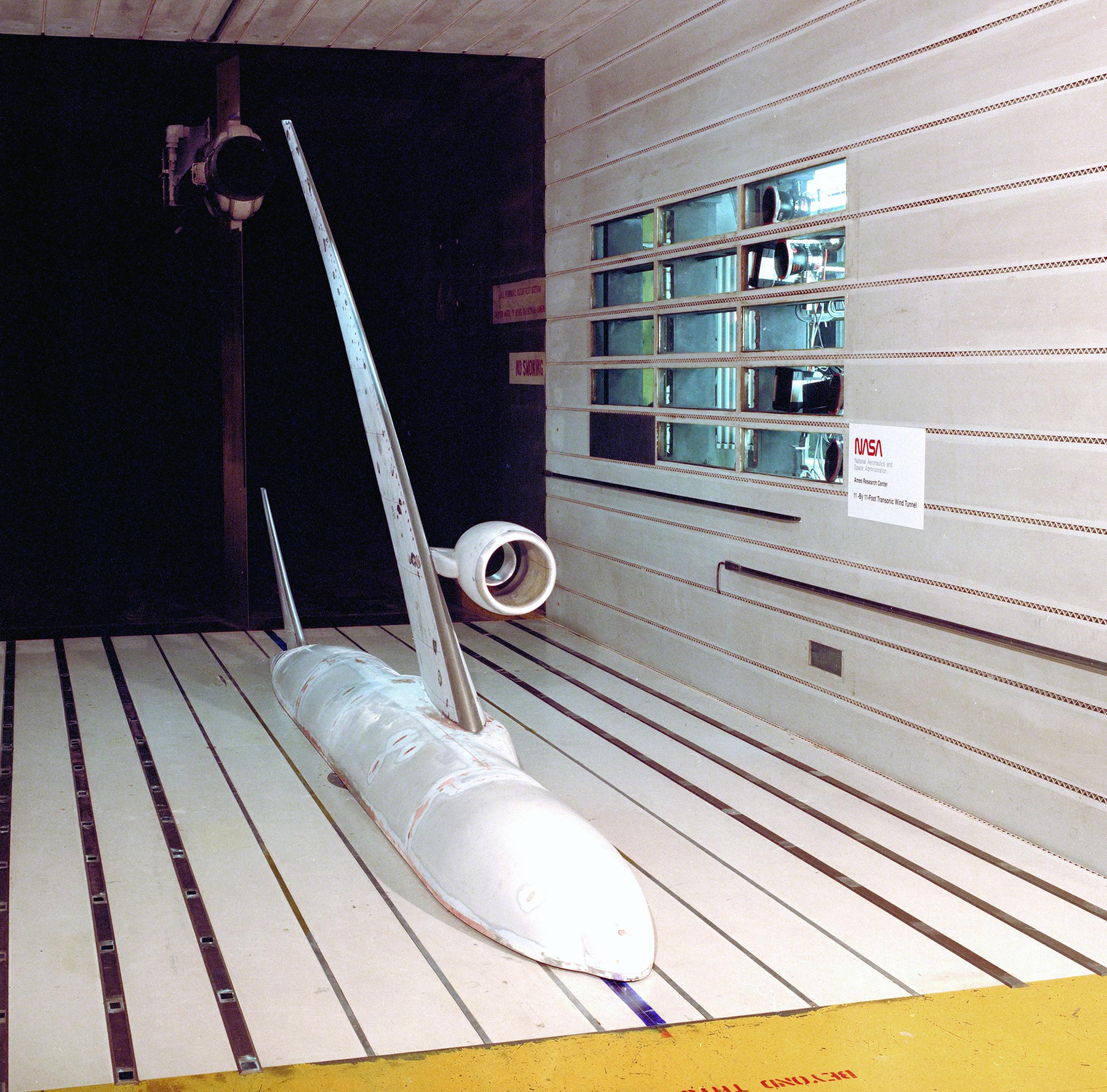
Half Span model of Boeing 777 in the 11-ft Test Section

== 9x7ft supersonic wind tunnel ==
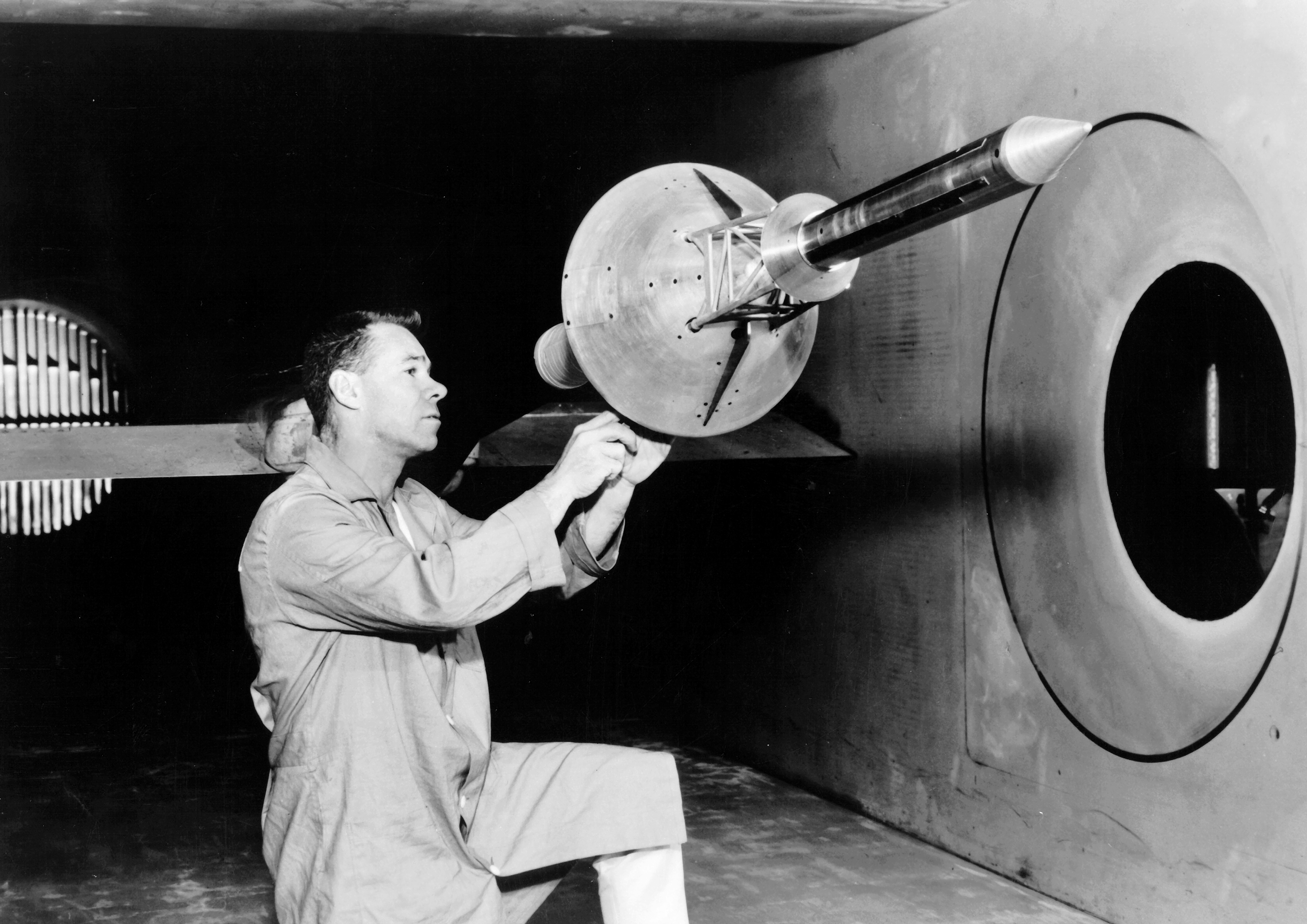
Apollo Launch Escape Tower Test in the 9x7ft Supersonic Wind Tunnel

The 9x7ft Supersonic Wind tunnel is capable of speeds from Mach 1.55 to Mach 2.5. Mach number is set by moving an asymmetric, sliding nozzle block. Airflow is produced by an 11-stage, axial-flow compressor that weighs over 450 tons.

== See also ==
- Wind tunnel
- List of wind tunnels
