= Ken Munechika =

American aerospace engineer

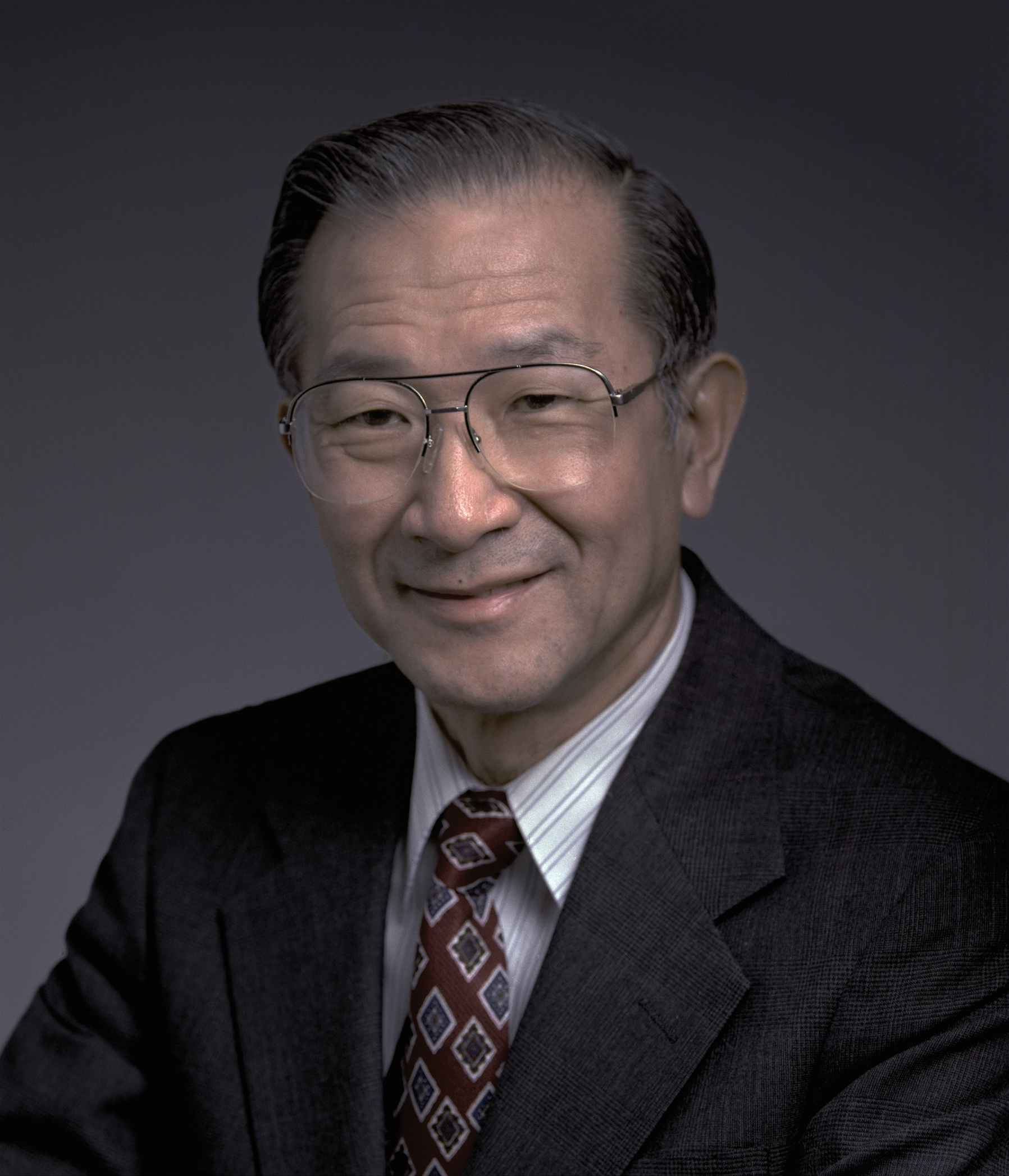
- Portrait in 1994
- Born: Kenji Munechika; June 18, 1935; Pākalā, Hawaiʻi, U.S.
- Died: June 10, 2022 (aged 86); Kāneʻohe, Hawaiʻi, U.S.
- Education: University of Southern California (EdD)
- Spouse: Grace S. Munechika

Ken Kenji Munechika (June 18, 1935 – June 10, 2022) was an American aerospace engineer and U.S. Air Force colonel. He was the seventh director of NASA's Ames Research Center from 1994 to 1996 and the first director of Moffett Federal Airfield.

== Early life and education ==
Munechika was born in Pākalā, a village on the south shore of the island of Kauaʻi, Hawaiʻi, in 1935. He earned a doctorate in educational administration from the University of Southern California. He later trained as a professor of aerospace studies.

== Career ==
Munechika served in the U.S. Air Force for more than thirty years, including two decades in aerospace. He started as a navigator and flew 200 combat missions in Southeast Asia during the Vietnam War. He served as chief of satellite operations, leading the recovery of deorbited spacecraft capsules. He also served as senior commander of the Air Force Satellite Control Facility in Sunnyvale, California (now Onizuka Air Force Station), where he directed launch operations for more than fifty defense satellites. Munechika oversaw payload operations for all defense payloads launched on NASA's Space Shuttle. He retired as a colonel in June 1989.

After a few years as executive director of Hawaii's office of space industry, he was appointed the seventh director of Ames Research Center on January 28, 1994, succeeding Dale L. Compton. Munechika was recommended by Senator Daniel Inouye of Hawaii to Daniel Goldin, the administrator of NASA. Under his leadership, Ames developed the NASA Astrobiology Institute, the Lunar Prospector mission, attained control of the Moffett Naval Air Station, and implemented zero-base review. In 1994, the Ames-Dryden Flight Research Center at Edwards Air Force Base became an independent NASA center, later named the Armstrong Flight Research Center.

He stated that "since aeronautics and space are for everybody, I want Ames to look like America and the community we represent... where everyone feels empowered, included, valued, and respected." Munechika served as director until March 4, 1996, after which he was succeeded by Henry McDonald.

Munechika was named the first director of Moffett Federal Airfield after NASA became the host agency of the federal facility. The airfield was occupied by more than 10,000 active duty military personnel, along with civilian and military reserves.

He died in 2022. He was buried at the Hawaii State Veterans Cemetery in Kāneʻohe on the island of Oʻahu.

== Personal life ==
He legally changed his name to Ken, from Kenji, in 1966. He and his wife Grace S. Munechika had three sons.
