= Harry McDonald (disambiguation) =

Harry McDonald was an English footballer.

Harry or Harold McDonald may also refer to:

- Henry McDonald (engineer), known as Harry, professor of computational engineering
- Harry McDonald, architect with his brothers at the firm McDonald Brothers and a Kentucky state legislator
- Harold McDonald (footballer, born 1922) (1922–1999), Australian footballer for Carlton
- Harold McDonald (footballer, born 1925) (1925–2001), Australian footballer for Port Adelaide

== See also ==
- Harry MacDonald (disambiguation)
- Henry McDonald (disambiguation)
