= Dale L. Compton =

American aerospace engineer

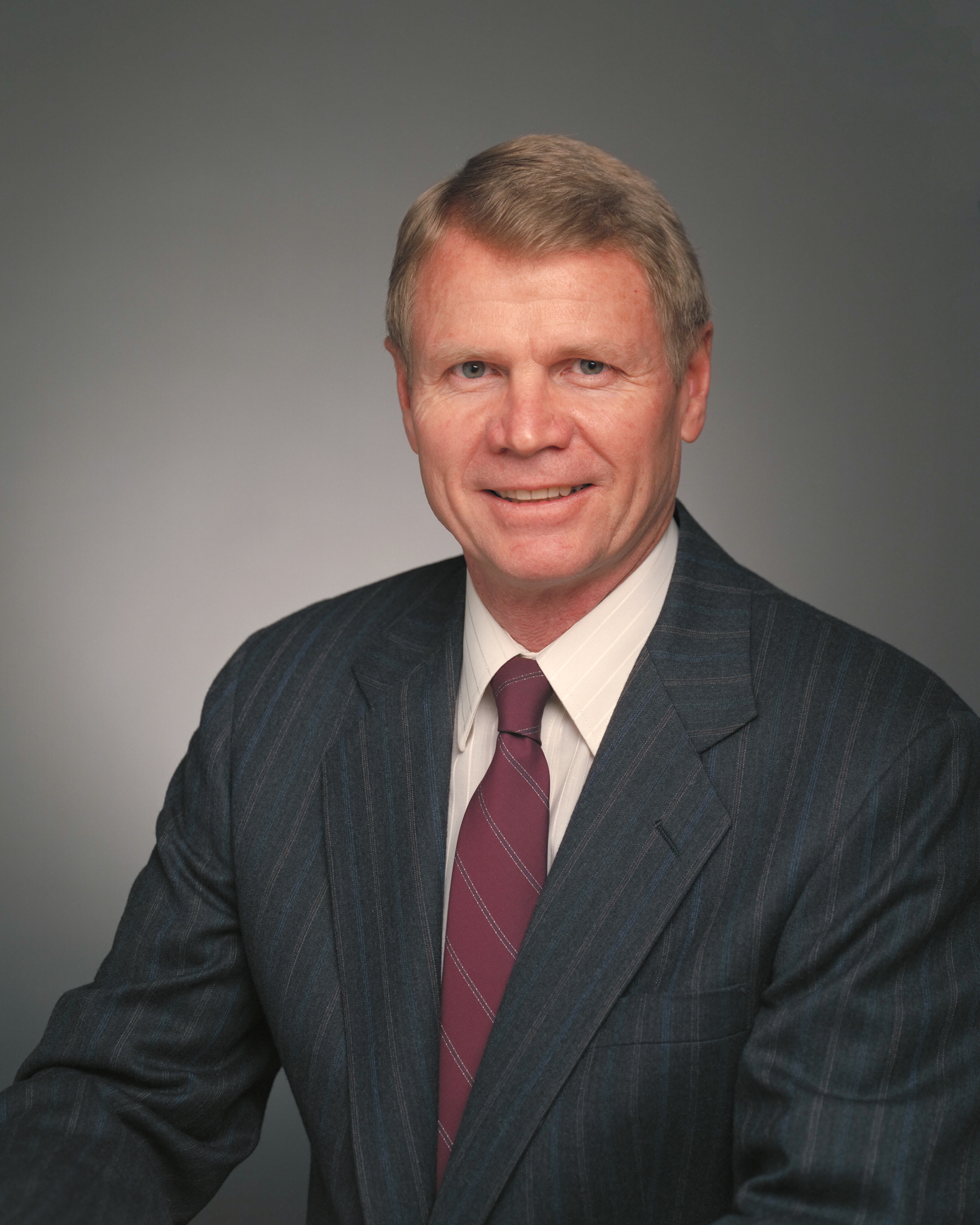
- Portrait in 1990
- Born: Dale Leonard Compton; 1935 (age 90–91)
- Education: Stanford University (BS, MS, PhD)
- Occupation: Aerospace engineer
- Years active: 1958–1994
- Known for: Infrared Astronomical Satellite
- Spouse: Doris Compton
- Awards: NASA Outstanding Leadership Medal (1984)

Dale Leonard Compton (born June 1935) is an American aerospace engineer. He was the sixth director of NASA's Ames Research Center, serving from 1989 to 1994.

== Early life and education ==
Compton earned a Bachelor of Science in aeronautical engineering from Stanford University in 1957, where he was a member of Sigma Nu. He also earned a Master of Science in 1958 as one of the first students taught by former Ames aerodynamicist Walter G. Vincenti.

He earned a doctorate from Stanford in 1969. He was a Sloan Fellow at MIT from 1974 to 1975 and attended the Advanced Management Program at Harvard Business School in 1986.

== Career ==
Compton joined Ames Research Center as a research scientist studying aerodynamics. His early work studied ablation and aerothermodynamic effects on ballistic missiles. He was a scientist for fifteen years, contributing to Project Mercury, Project Gemini, and the Apollo program.

In the mid-1970s, Compton entered management, serving as deputy director for astronautics. He was later appointed chief of the space science division and manager of the IRAS telescope project office. He was also made director of engineering and computer systems at Ames and named deputy director to William F. Ballhaus Jr. in 1985.

On February 1, 1988, Compton became acting center director of Ames until February 1, 1989, succeeding Ballhaus. He resumed the position on July 15, 1989, and was formally appointed director on December 20, 1989, the fiftieth anniversary of the center's founding by Smith J. DeFrance.

He was considered conservative in his vision for Ames by some at NASA, and even a "tunnel hugger" for believing that Ames' standing at NASA was dependent on its wind tunnel flight research. In his view, project-oriented centers went through boom and bust cycles as Congress approved or rejected major projects, and Ames could be protected by its specialization. Ames received $300 million in the late 1980s for wind tunnel and simulator restoration projects, which Compton ensured received the highest priority. Compton also fought for projects conceived at Ames, including the Space Infrared Telescope Facility, Mars Observer, and Magellan, to be executed at Ames, but ultimately lost to the Jet Propulsion Laboratory.

In the early 1990s, with the fall of the Soviet Union and reduction in budget for space research, Compton led the center against efforts to have Ames shut down. He said "Ames has never had a secure place [at NASA]. All directors have tried to secure a place; some have succeeded, some not. My years as director were not easy." He served as director until his retirement on January 28, 1994, and was succeeded by Ken Munechika.

He was recognized by the city of Mountain View, California in 1994 for his service. He is a fellow of the American Institute of Aeronautics and Astronautics.

== Awards ==
- Rotary National Award for Space Achievement
- Presidential Rank Award (1984)
- NASA Outstanding Leadership Medal (1984)
