= Ames Research Center =

NASA research facility in Northern California

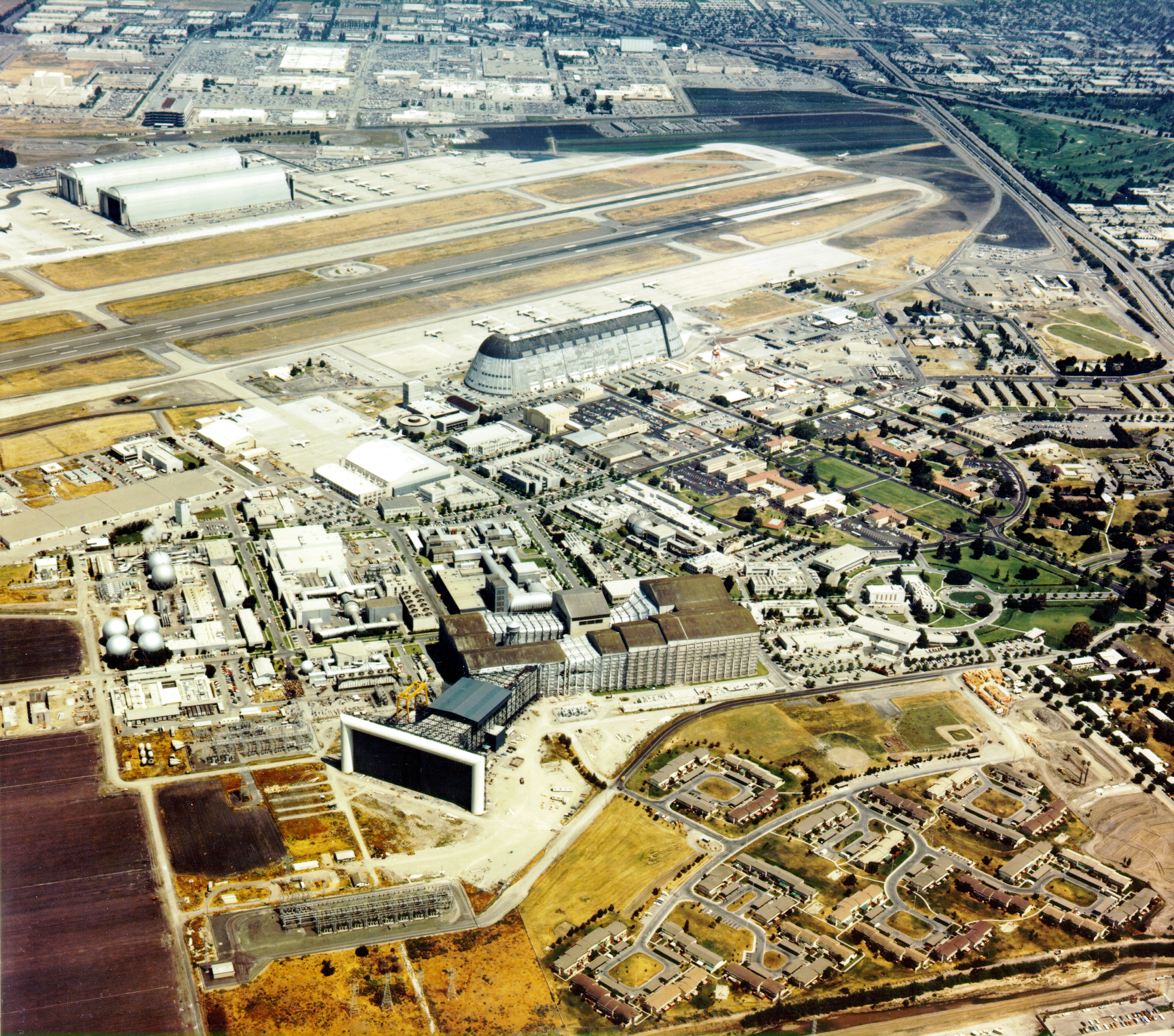
- Aerial view of Moffett Field and Ames Research Center in 1982

Agency overview
- Formed: December 20, 1939
- Jurisdiction: U.S. federal government
- Headquarters: Moffett Field, California, U.S.
- Agency executive: Eugene Tu, director
- Parent agency: NASA
- Website: nasa.gov/ames

Map
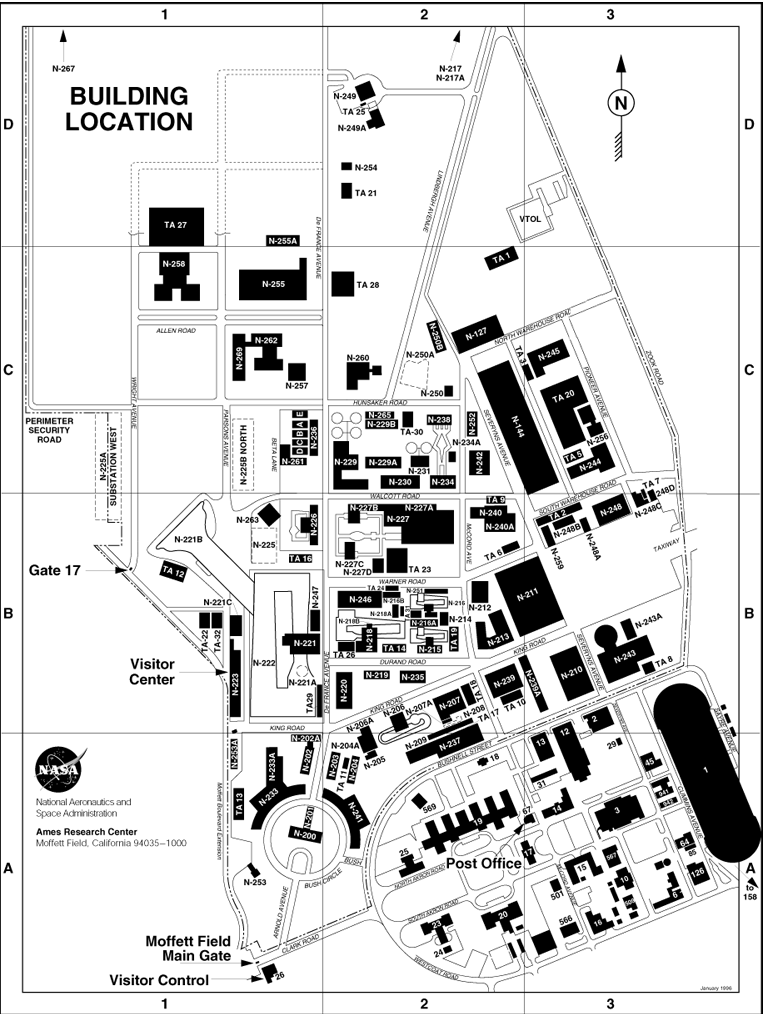
- Map of NASA Ames Research Center

The Ames Research Center (ARC), also known as NASA Ames, is a major NASA research center at Moffett Federal Airfield in California's Silicon Valley. It was founded in 1939 as the second National Advisory Committee for Aeronautics (NACA) laboratory. That agency was dissolved and its assets and personnel transferred to the newly created NASA on October 1, 1958. NASA Ames is named in honor of Joseph Sweetman Ames, a physicist and one of the founding members of NACA. At last estimate NASA Ames had over $3 billion in capital equipment, 2,300 research personnel and a $750 million annual budget.

Ames was founded to conduct wind-tunnel research on the aerodynamics of propeller-driven aircraft; however, its role has expanded to encompass spaceflight and information technology. Ames plays a role in many NASA missions. It provides leadership in astrobiology; small satellites; robotic lunar exploration; the search for habitable planets; supercomputing; intelligent/adaptive systems; advanced thermal protection; planetary science; and airborne astronomy. Ames also develops tools for a safer, more efficient national airspace. The center's current director is Eugene Tu.

The site was mission center for several key missions (Kepler, the Stratospheric Observatory for Infrared Astronomy (SOFIA), Interface Region Imaging Spectrograph) and a major contributor to the "new exploration focus" as a participant in the Orion crew exploration vehicle.

== Missions ==
Although Ames is a NASA Research Center, and not a flight center, it has nevertheless been closely involved in a number of astronomy and space missions.

The Pioneer program's eight successful space missions from 1965 to 1978 were managed by Charles Hall at Ames, initially aimed at the inner Solar System. By 1972, it supported the bold flyby missions to Jupiter and Saturn with Pioneer 10 and Pioneer 11. Those two missions were trail blazers (radiation environment, new moons, gravity-assist flybys) for the planners of the more complex Voyager 1 and Voyager 2 missions, launched five years later. In 1978, the end of the program brought about a return to the inner solar system, with the Pioneer Venus Orbiter and Multiprobe, this time using orbital insertion rather than flyby missions.

Lunar Prospector was the third mission selected by NASA for full development and construction as part of the Discovery Program. At a cost of $62.8 million, the 19-month mission was put into a low polar orbit of the Moon, accomplishing mapping of surface composition and possible polar ice deposits, measurements of magnetic and gravity fields, and study of lunar outgassing events. Based on Lunar Prospector Neutron Spectrometer (NS) data, mission scientists have determined that there is indeed water ice in the polar craters of the Moon. The mission ended July 31, 1999, when the orbiter was guided to an impact into a crater near the lunar south pole in an (unsuccessful) attempt to analyze lunar polar water by vaporizing it to allow spectroscopic characterization from Earth telescopes.

The 11-pound (5 kg) GeneSat-1, carrying bacteria inside a miniature laboratory, was launched on December 16, 2006. The small NASA satellite has proven that scientists can quickly design and launch a new class of inexpensive spacecraft.

The Lunar Crater Observation and Sensing Satellite (LCROSS) mission to look for water on the Moon was a 'secondary payload spacecraft.' LCROSS began its trip to the Moon on the same rocket as the Lunar Reconnaissance Orbiter (LRO), which continues to conduct a different lunar task. It launched in April 2009 on an Atlas V rocket from Kennedy Space Center, Florida.

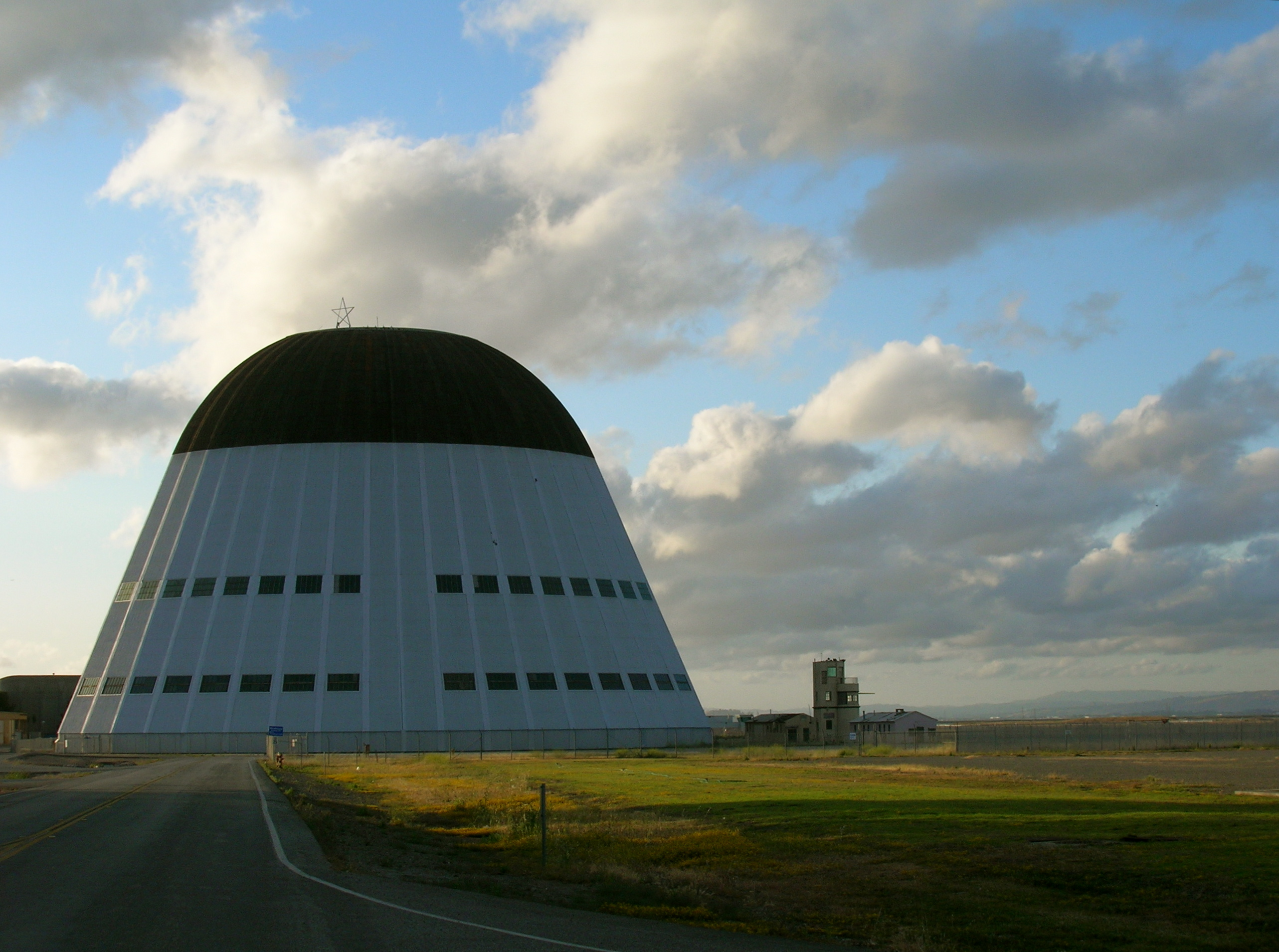
Hangar One, originally a US Navy airship hangar, in Moffett Field, California

The Kepler mission was NASA's first mission capable of finding Earth-size and smaller planets. The Kepler mission monitored the brightness of stars to find planets that pass in front of them during the planets' orbits. During such passes or 'transits,' the planets will slightly decrease the star's brightness.

Stratospheric Observatory for Infrared Astronomy (SOFIA) was a joint venture of the U.S. and German aerospace agencies, NASA and the German Aerospace Center (DLR) to make an infrared telescope platform that can fly at altitudes high enough to be in the infrared-transparent regime above the water vapor in the Earth's atmosphere. The aircraft was supplied by the U.S., and the infrared telescope by Germany. Modifications of the Boeing 747SP airframe to accommodate the telescope, mission-unique equipment and large external door were made by L-3 Communications Integrated Systems of Waco, Texas.

The Interface Region Imaging Spectrograph mission is a partnership with the Lockheed Martin Solar and Astrophysics Laboratory to understand the processes at the boundary between the Sun's chromosphere and corona. This mission is sponsored by the NASA Small Explorer program.

The Lunar Atmosphere Dust Environment Explorer (LADEE) mission has been developed by NASA Ames. This successfully launched to the Moon on September 6, 2013.

In addition, Ames has played a support role in a number of missions, most notably the Mars Pathfinder and Mars Exploration Rover missions, where the Ames Intelligent Robotics Laboratory played a key role. NASA Ames was a partner on the Mars Phoenix, a Mars Scout Program mission to send a high-latitude lander to Mars, deployed a robotic arm to dig trenches up to 1.6 feet (one half meter) into the layers of water ice and analyzing the soil composition. Ames is also a partner on the Mars Science Laboratory and its Curiosity rover, a next generation Mars rover to explore for signs of organics and complex molecules.

== Aviation systems ==
- Flight And Guidance Simulation Laboratory
- U.S. National Register of Historic Places
- Location: 655 Cooper Ln., NASA Ames Research Center, Moffett Field, California
- Coordinates: 37°24′54″N 122°03′22″W
- NRHP reference No.: 100000469
- Added to NRHP: January 11, 2017

The Aviation Systems Division conducts research and development in two primary areas: air traffic management, and high-fidelity flight simulation. For air traffic management, researchers are creating and testing concepts to allow for up to three times today's level of aircraft in the national airspace. Automation and its attendant safety consequences are key foundations of the concept development. Historically, the division has developed products that have been implemented for the flying public, such as the Traffic Management Adviser, which is being deployed nationwide.

For high-fidelity flight simulation, the division operates the world's largest flight simulator (the Vertical Motion Simulator), a Level-D 747-400 simulator, and a panoramic air traffic control tower simulator. These simulators have been used for a variety of purposes including continued training for Space Shuttle pilots, development of future spacecraft handling qualities, helicopter control system testing, Joint Strike Fighter evaluations, and accident investigations. Personnel in the division have a variety of technical backgrounds, including guidance and control, flight mechanics, flight simulation, and computer science. Customers outside NASA have included the FAA, DOD, DHS, DOT, NTSB, Lockheed Martin, and Boeing.

The center's flight simulation and guidance laboratory was listed on the National Register of Historic Places in 2017.

== Information technology ==
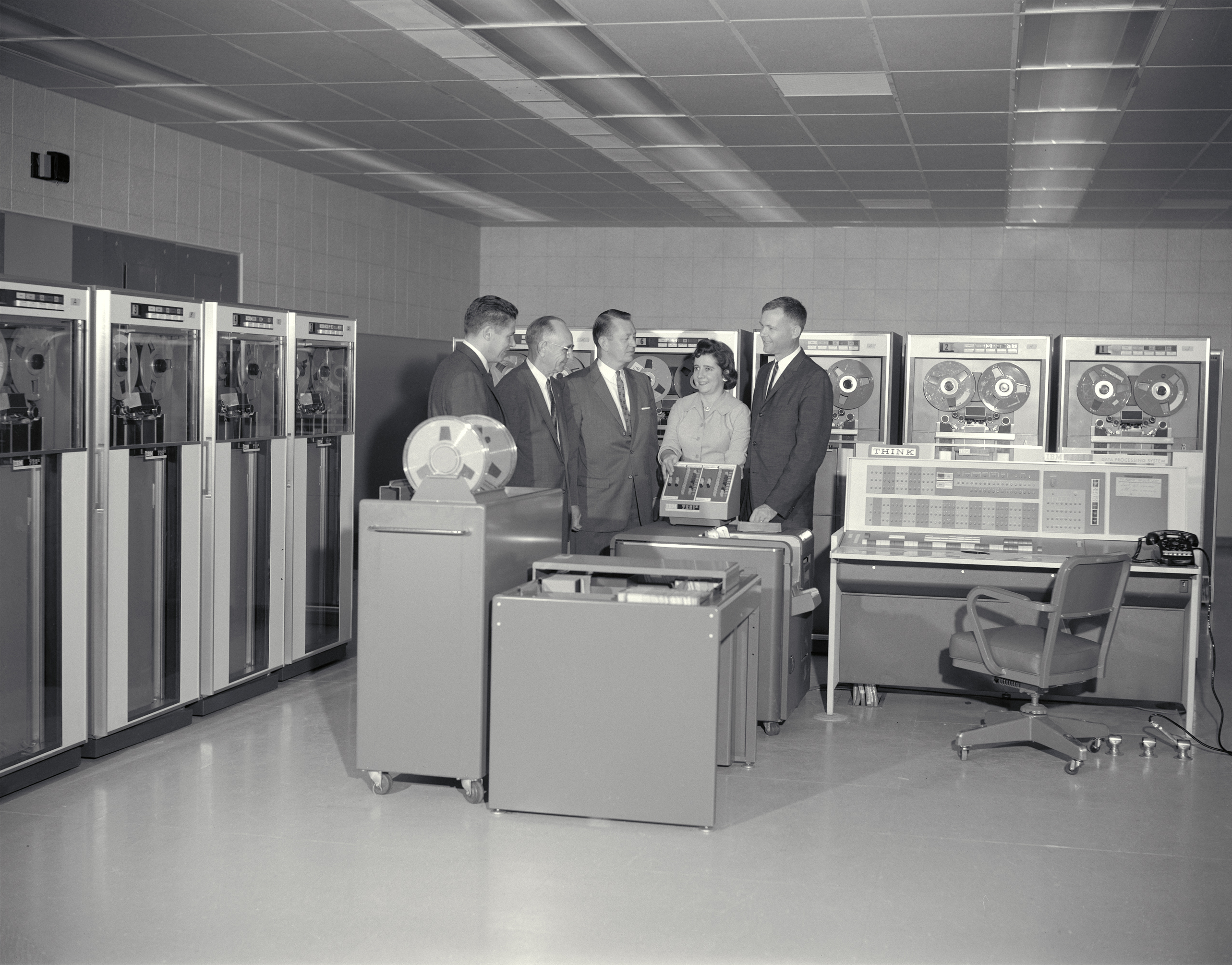
IBM 7090 mainframe computer at Ames in 1961. Smith DeFrance, Ames' founding director, is second from the left.

Ames is the home of NASA's large research and development divisions in advanced supercomputing, human factors, and artificial intelligence (Intelligent Systems). These Research & Development organizations support NASA's Exploration efforts, as well as the continued operations of the International Space Station, and the space science and Aeronautics work across NASA. The center also runs and maintains the E Root nameserver of the DNS.

The Intelligent Systems Division (Code TI) is NASA's leading R&D Division developing advanced intelligent software and systems for all of NASA Mission Directorates. It provides software expertise for earth science applications, aeronautics, space science missions, International Space Station, and the Crewed Exploration Vehicle (CEV).

The first AI in space (Deep Space 1) was developed from Code TI, as is the MAPGEN software that daily plans the activities for the Mars Exploration Rovers, the same core reasoner is used for Ensemble to operate Phoenix Lander, and the planning system for the International Space Station's solar arrays. Integrated System Health Management for the International Space Station's control moment gyroscopes, collaborative systems with semantic search tools, and robust software engineering round out the scope of Code TI's work.

The Human Systems Integration Division "advances human-centered design and operations of complex aerospace systems through analysis, experimentation, and modeling of human performance and human-automation interaction to make dramatic improvements in safety, efficiency and mission success". For decades, the Human Systems Integration Division has been on the leading edge of human-centered aerospace research. The Division is home to over 100 researchers, contractors and administrative staff.

The NASA Advanced Supercomputing Division at Ames operates several of the agency's most powerful supercomputers, including the petaflop-scale Pleiades, Aitken, and Electra systems. Originally called the Numerical Aerodynamic Simulation Division, the facility has housed more than 40 production and test supercomputers since its construction in 1987, and has served as a leader in high-performance computing, developing technology used across the industry, including the NAS Parallel Benchmarks and the Portable Batch System (PBS) job scheduling software.

In September 2009, Ames launched NEBULA as a fast and powerful Cloud Computing Platform to handle NASA's massive data sets that complied with security requirements. This pilot uses open-source components, complies with FISMA and can scale to Government-sized demands while being extremely energy efficient. In July 2010, NASA CTO Chris C. Kemp open sourced Nova, the technology behind the NEBULA Project, in collaboration with Rackspace, launching OpenStack. OpenStack has subsequently become one of the largest and fastest growing open source projects in the history of computing, and as of 2014 has been included in most major distributions of Linux including Red Hat, Oracle, HP, SUSE, and Canonical.

== Image processing ==
NASA Ames was one of the first locations to conduct research on image processing of satellite-platform aerial photography. Some of the pioneering techniques of contrast enhancement using Fourier analysis were developed at Ames in conjunction with researchers at ESL Inc.

== Wind tunnels ==
- NASA Ames Wind Tunnel Historic District
- U.S. National Register of Historic Places
- U.S. Historic district
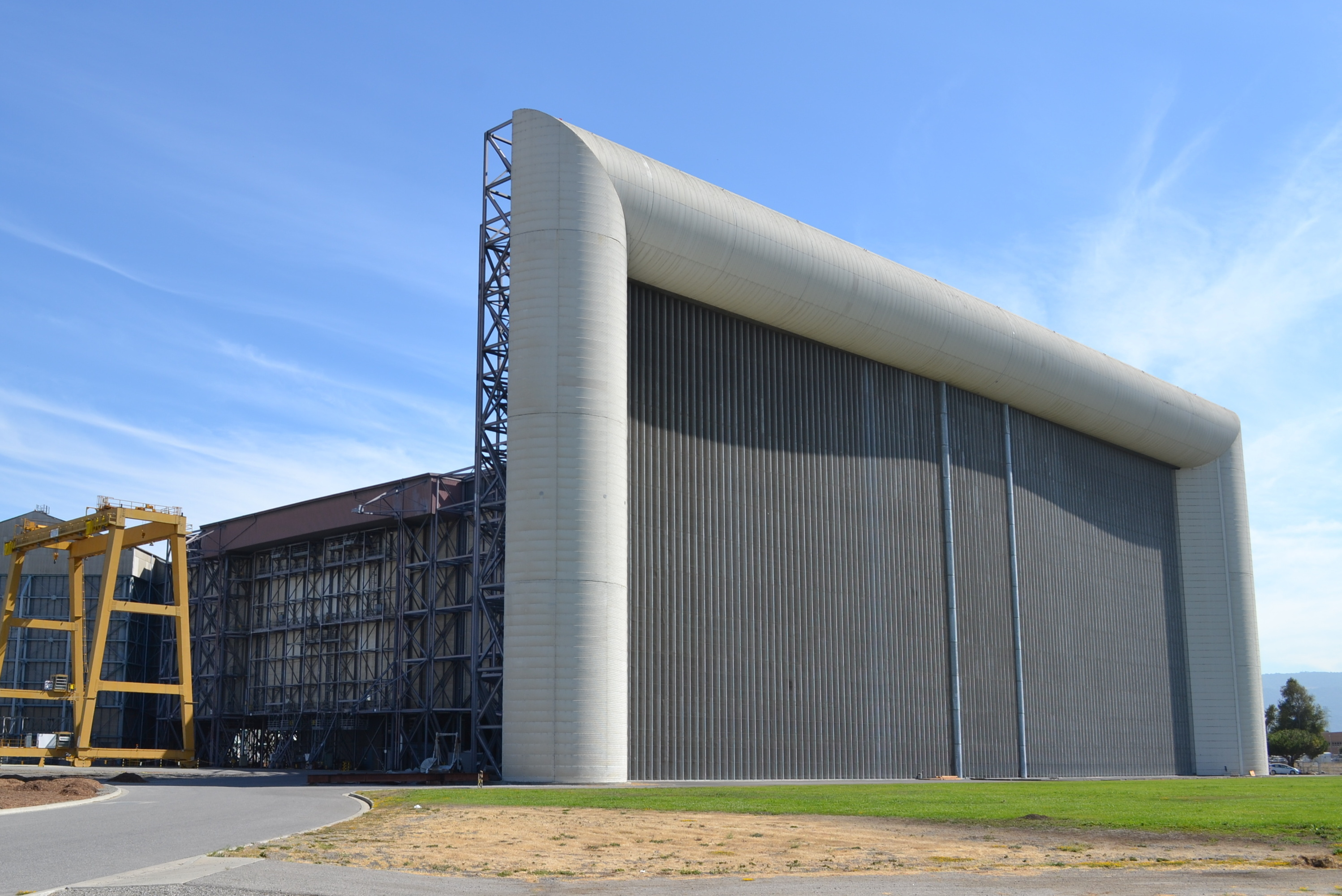
- One of the air intakes of the 80 by 120 foot wind tunnel (world's largest), located at NASA Ames Research Center
- Location: NASA Ames Research Center, Moffett Field, California
- Area: 46.3 acres (18.7 ha)
- NRHP reference No.: 100000470
- Added to NRHP: January 11, 2017

The Ames Research Center wind tunnels are known not only for their immense size, but also for their diverse characteristics that enable various kinds of scientific and engineering research. The complex of wind tunnels was nominated to the National Register of Historic Places in 1995 and listed in 2017.

=== ARC Unitary Plan Wind Tunnel ===
The Unitary Plan Wind Tunnel (UPWT) was completed in 1956 at a cost of $27 million under the Unitary Plan Act of 1949. Since its completion, the UPWT facility has been the most heavily used NASA wind tunnel within the NASA Wind Tunnel Fleet. Every major commercial transport and almost every military jet built in the United States over the last 40 years has been tested in this facility. Mercury, Gemini, and Apollo spacecraft, as well as Space Shuttle, were also tested in this tunnel complex.

=== National Full-Scale Aerodynamics Complex (NFAC) ===
Ames Research Center also houses the world's largest wind tunnel, part of the National Full-Scale Aerodynamic Complex (NFAC): it is large enough to test full-sized planes, rather than scale models.

The 40 by 80 foot wind tunnel circuit was originally constructed in the 1940s and is now capable of providing test velocities up to 300 knots (560 km/h; 350 mph). It is used to support an active research program in aerodynamics, dynamics, model noise, and full-scale aircraft and their components. The aerodynamic characteristics of new configurations are investigated with an emphasis on estimating the accuracy of computational methods. The tunnel is also used to investigate the aeromechanical stability boundaries of advanced rotorcraft and rotor-fuselage interactions. Stability and control derivatives are also determined, including the static and dynamic characteristics of new aircraft configurations. The acoustic characteristics of most of the full-scale vehicles are also determined, as well as acoustic research aimed at discovering and reducing aerodynamic sources of noise. In addition to the normal data gathering methods (e.g., balance system, pressure measuring transducers, and temperature sensing thermocouples), state-of-the-art, non-intrusive instrumentation (e.g., laser velocimeters and shadowgraphs) are available to help determine flow direction and velocity in and around the lifting surfaces of aircraft. The 40 by 80 Foot Wind Tunnel is primarily used for determining the low- and medium-speed aerodynamic characteristics of high-performance aircraft, rotorcraft, and fixed wing, powered-lift V/STOL aircraft.

The 80 by 120 Foot Wind Tunnel is the world's largest wind tunnel test section. This open circuit leg was added and a new fan drive system was installed in the 1980s. It is currently capable of air speeds up to 100 knots (190 km/h; 120 mph). This section is used in similar ways to the 40 by 80 foot section, but it is capable of testing larger aircraft, albeit at slower speeds. Some of the test programs that have come through the 80 by 120 Foot include: F-18 High Angle of Attack Vehicle, DARPA/Lockheed Common Affordable Lightweight Fighter, XV-15 Tilt Rotor, and Advance Recovery System Parafoil. The 80 by 120 foot test section is capable of testing a full size Boeing 737.

Although decommissioned by NASA in 2003, the NFAC is now being operated by the United States Air Force as a satellite facility of the Arnold Engineering Development Complex (AEDC).

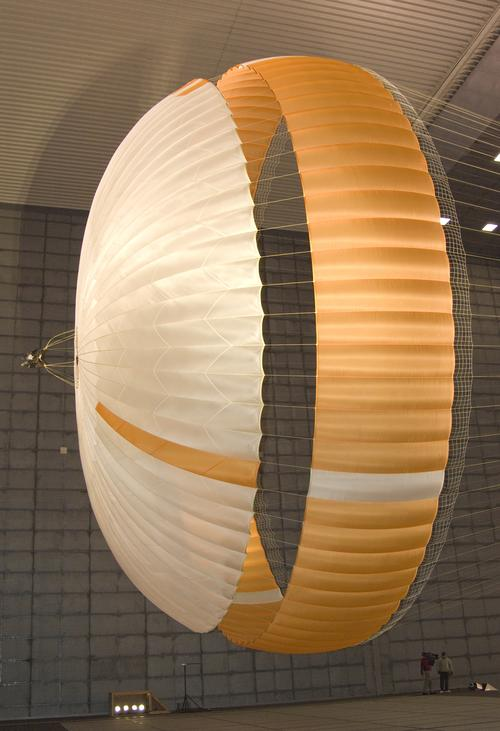
The Mars Science Laboratory landing parachute under test in the 80 by 120-foot wind tunnel. Note the people in the lower-right corner of the image.

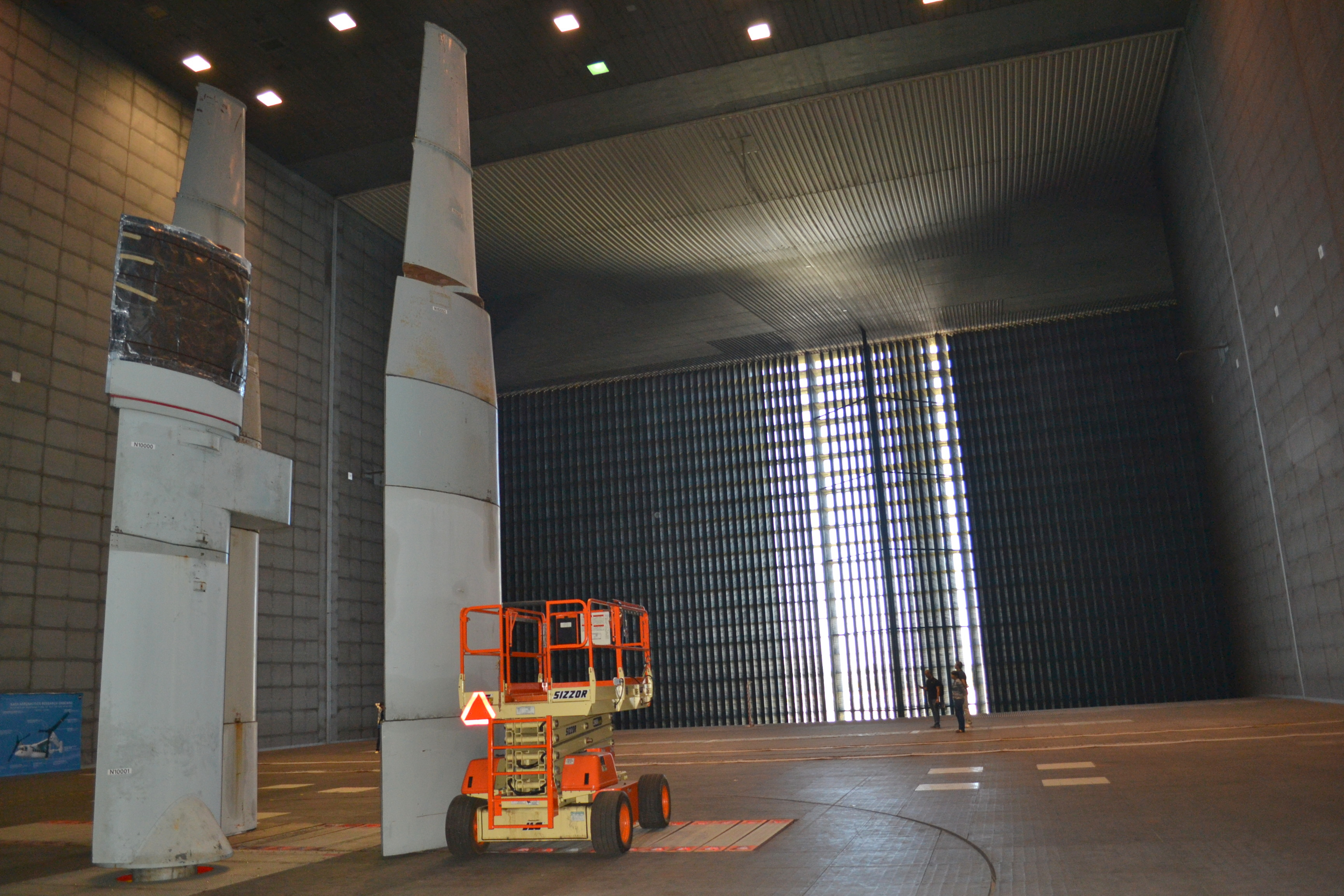
Inside 80 by 120-foot wind tunnel facing towards the intake. Aircraft or scaled models of them can be mounted on the three struts in the foreground which in this picture hold individual airplane wing portions.

== Arc Jet Complex ==
- Arc Jet Complex
- U.S. National Register of Historic Places
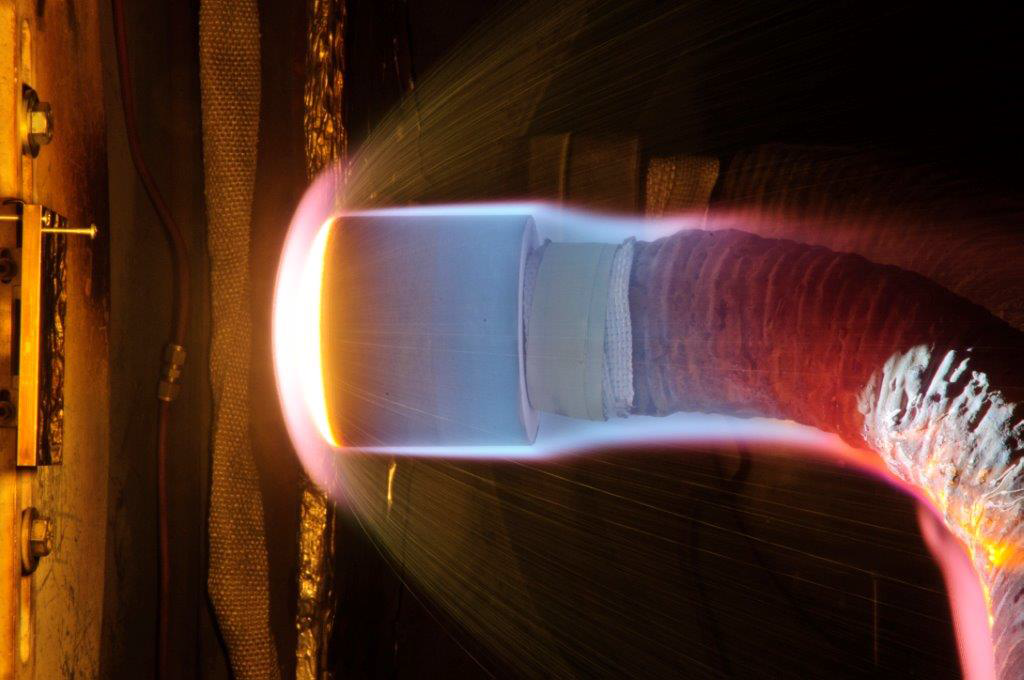
- A thermal protection system sample under test at the Arc Jet Complex.
- Location: 980 Mark Ave., NASA Ames Research Center, Moffett Field, California
- Coordinates: 37°25′06″N 122°03′32″W
- NRHP reference No.: 100000466
- Added to NRHP: January 11, 2017

The Ames Arc Jet Complex is an advanced thermophysics facility where sustained hypersonic- and hyperthermal testing of vehicular thermoprotective systems takes place under a variety of simulated flight- and re-entry conditions. Of its seven available test bays, four currently contain Arc Jet units of differing configurations. These are the Aerodynamic Heating Facility (AHF), the Turbulent Flow Duct (TFD), the Panel Test Facility (PTF), and the Interaction Heating Facility (IHF). The support equipment includes two D.C. power supplies, a steam ejector-driven vacuum system, a water-cooling system, high-pressure gas systems, data acquisition system, and other auxiliary systems.

The largest power supply is capable of delivering 75 megawatts (MW) over 30 minutes or 150 MW over 15 seconds, which, coupled with a high-volume 5-stage steam ejector vacuum-pumping system, allows Ames to match high-altitude atmospheric conditions with large samples. The Thermo-Physics Facilities Branch operates four arc jet facilities. The Interaction Heating Facility (IHF), with an available power of over 60-MW, is one of the highest-power arc jets available. It is a very flexible facility, capable of long run times of up to one hour, and able to test large samples in both a stagnation and flat plate configuration. The Panel Test Facility (PTF) uses a unique semielliptic nozzle for testing panel sections. Powered by a 20-MW arc heater, the PTF can perform tests on samples for up to 20 minutes. The Turbulent Flow Duct provides supersonic, turbulent high temperature air flows over flat surfaces. The TFD is powered by a 20-MW Hüls arc heater and can test samples 203 by 508 millimeters (8.0 by 20.0 in) in size. The Aerodynamic Heating Facility (AHF) has similar characteristics to the IHF arc heater, offering a wide range of operating conditions, sample sizes and extended test times. A cold-air-mixing plenum allows for simulations of ascent or high-speed flight conditions. Catalycity studies using air or nitrogen can be performed in this flexible rig. A 5-arm model support system allows the user to maximize testing efficiency. The AHF can be configured with either a Hüls or segmented arc heater, up to 20-MW. 1 MW is enough power to supply 750 homes.

The Arc Jet Complex was listed on the National Register of Historic Places in 2017.

== Range complex ==
=== Ames Vertical Gun Range ===
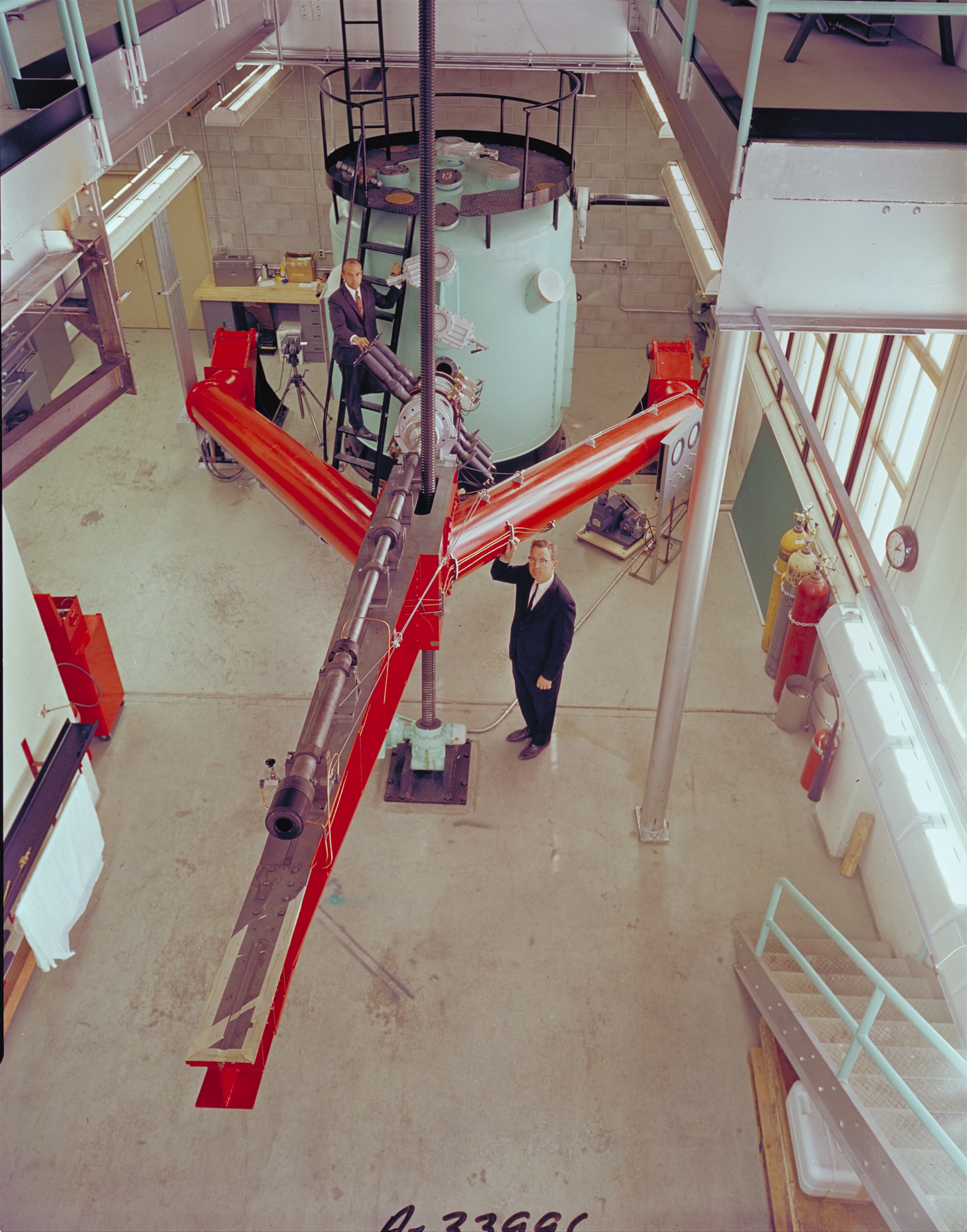
Vertical Gun Range in horizontal loading position

The Ames Vertical Gun Range (AVGR) was designed to conduct scientific studies of lunar impact processes in support of the Apollo missions. In 1979, it was established as a National Facility, funded through the Planetary Geology and Geophysics Program. In 1995, increased scientific needs across various disciplines resulted in joint core funding by three different science programs at NASA Headquarters (Planetary Geology and Geophysics, Exobiology, and Solar System Origins). In addition, the AVGR provides programmatic support for various proposed and ongoing planetary missions (e.g. Stardust, Deep Impact).

Using its 0.30 cal light-gas gun and powder gun, the AVGR can launch projectiles to velocities ranging from 500 to 7,000 m/s (1,600 to 23,000 ft/s; 1,100 to 15,700 mph). By varying the gun's angle of elevation with respect to the target vacuum chamber, impact angles from 0° to 90° relative to the gravitational vector are possible. This unique feature is extremely important in the study of crater formation processes.

The target chamber is approximately 2.5 meters (8 ft 2 in) in diameter and height and can accommodate a wide variety of targets and mounting fixtures. It can maintain vacuum levels below 0.03 torrs (4.0 Pa), or can be back filled with various gases to simulate different planetary atmospheres. Impact events are typically recorded with high-speed video/film, or Particle Image Velocimetry (PIV).

=== Hypervelocity Free-Flight Range ===
The Hypervelocity Free-Flight (HFF) Range currently comprises two active facilities: the Aerodynamic Facility (HFFAF) and the Gun Development Facility (HFFGDF). The HFFAF is a combined Ballistic Range and Shock-tube Driven Wind Tunnel. Its primary purpose is to examine the aerodynamic characteristics and flow-field structural details of free-flying aeroballistic models.

The HFFAF has a test section equipped with 16 shadowgraph-imaging stations. Each station can be used to capture an orthogonal pair of images of a hypervelocity model in flight. These images, combined with the recorded flight time history, can be used to obtain critical aerodynamic parameters such as lift, drag, static and dynamic stability, flow characteristics, and pitching moment coefficients. For very high Mach number (M > 25) simulations, models can be launched into a counter-flowing gas stream generated by the shock tube. The facility can also be configured for hypervelocity impact testing and has an aerothermodynamic capability as well. The HFFAF is currently configured to operate the 1.5 inches (38 mm) light-gas gun in support of continuing thermal imaging and transition research for NASA's hypersonics program.

The HFFGDF is used for gun performance enhancement studies, and occasional impact testing. The Facility uses the same arsenal of light-gas and powder guns as the HFFAF to accelerate particles that range in size from 3.2 to 25.4 millimeters (0.13 to 1.00 in) diameter to velocities ranging from 0.5 to 8.5 km/s (1,100 to 19,000 mph). Most of the research effort to date has centered on Earth atmosphere entry configurations (Mercury, Gemini, Apollo, and Shuttle), planetary entry designs (Viking, Pioneer Venus, Galileo and MSL), and aerobraking (AFE) configurations. The facility has also been used for scramjet propulsion studies (National Aerospace Plane (NASP)) and meteoroid/orbital debris impact studies (Space Station and RLV). In 2004, the facility was utilized for foam-debris dynamics testing in support of the Return To Flight effort. As of March 2007, the GDF has been reconfigured to operate a cold gas gun for subsonic CEV capsule aerodynamics.

=== Electric Arc Shock Tube ===
The Electric Arc Shock Tube (EAST) Facility is used to investigate the effects of radiation and ionization that occur during very high velocity atmospheric entries. In addition, the EAST can also provide air-blast simulations requiring the strongest possible shock generation in air at an initial pressure loading of 1 standard atmosphere (100 kPa) or greater. The facility has three separate driver configurations, to meet a range of test requirements: the driver can be connected to a diaphragm station of either a 102 millimeters (4.0 in) or a 610 millimeters (24 in) shock tube, and the high-pressure 102 millimeters (4.0 in) shock tube can also drive a 762 millimeters (30.0 in) shock tunnel. Energy for the drivers is supplied by a 1.25-MJ-capacitor storage system.

== Administration building ==
- Ames Administration Building
- U.S. National Register of Historic Places
- Location: Bush Cir., NASA Ames Research Center, Moffett Field, California
- Coordinates: 37°24′43″N 122°03′43″W
- NRHP reference No.: 100000467
- Added to NRHP: January 11, 2017

The Ames administration building (also known as Building N-200) is a structure dating from 1943. Located at the southwest corner of Moffett Field, it has a reinforced concrete facade with Streamline Moderne-inspired details. Inside are two stories and a basement. The administration building was nominated to the National Register of Historic Places in 1995 and listed in 2017.

== List of center directors ==
The following persons had served as the Ames Research Center director:

No.	Image	Director	Start	End	Notes
1		Smith J. DeFrance	July 25, 1940	June 24, 1947	Engineer-in-Charge, NACA Ames Aeronautical Laboratory
1		Smith J. DeFrance	June 24, 1947	October 1, 1958	Director, NACA Ames Aeronautical Laboratory
1		Smith J. DeFrance	October 1, 1958	October 15, 1965	Director, NASA Ames RC
2		H. Julian Allen	October 15, 1965	November 15, 1968	
3		Hans Mark	February 20 1969	August 15, 1977	
Acting		Clarence A. Syvertson	August 15, 1977	April 30 1978	
4		Clarence A. Syvertson	April 30, 1978	January 13, 1984	
5		William F. Ballhaus Jr.	January 16, 1984	February 1, 1988	
5		William F. Ballhaus Jr.	February 1, 1989	July 15, 1989	
Acting		Dale L. Compton	February 1, 1988	February 1, 1989	
Acting		Dale L. Compton	July 15, 1989	December 20, 1989	
6		Dale L. Compton	December 20, 1989	January 28, 1994	
7		Ken Munechika	January 28, 1994	March 4, 1996	
8		Henry McDonald	March 4, 1996	September 19, 2002	
9		G. Scott Hubbard	September 19, 2002	February 15, 2006	
Acting		Marvin Christensen	February 15, 2005	May 4, 2006	
10		Simon P. Worden	May 4, 2006	March 31, 2015	
11		Eugene Tu	May 4, 2015	present	

== United States Geological Survey (USGS) ==
In 2016, the United States Geological Survey (USGS) announced plans to relocate its West Coast science center from nearby Menlo Park to the Ames Research Center at Moffett Field. The relocation formally began with a ribbon-cutting event in July 2019. As of April 2024 the project was described as "wrapping up", with "full relocation ... scheduled by the end of the year."

== Education ==
=== NASA Ames Visitor Center ===
The NASA Experience exhibit at the Chabot Space and Science Center serves as the visitor center for NASA's Ames Research Center. The NASA Experience provides a dynamic and interactive space for the public to learn about local contributions to space exploration across the years. From models of spacecraft and genuine spacesuits from as early as the Mercury and Gemini missions to artifacts related to NASA's upcoming Artemis missions, the NASA Ames Visitor Center gives visitors access to over 80 years of Ames history and a look into current and future projects. Ames' expertise in wind tunnel testing, rover design and testing, space robotics, supercomputing, and more is on display. The exhibit was opened on November 12, 2021.

=== NASA Ames Exploration Center ===
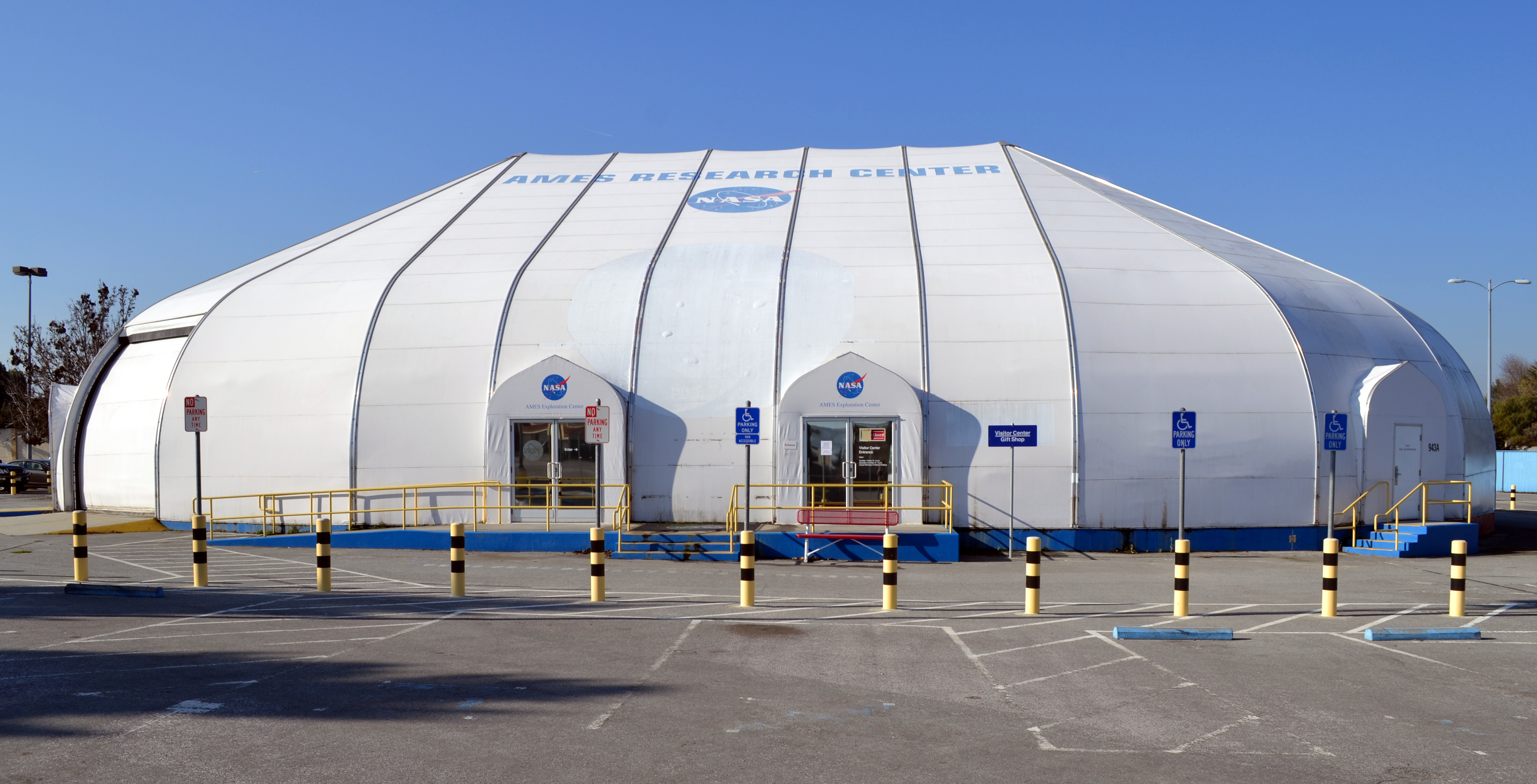
NASA Ames Exploration Center

The NASA Ames Exploration Center is a science museum and education center for NASA. There are displays and interactive exhibits about NASA technology, missions and space exploration. A Moon rock, meteorite, and other geologic samples are on display. The theater shows movies with footage from NASA's explorations of Mars and the planets, and about the contributions of the scientists at Ames. This facility is currently closed.

=== Robotics Alliance Project ===
In 1999, Mark León developed NASA's Robotics Education Project — now called the Robotics Alliance Project — under his mentor Dave Lavery, which has reached over 100,000 students nationwide using FIRST robotics and BOTBALL robotics competitions. The Project's FIRST branch originally comprised FRC Team 254: "The Cheesy Poofs", an all-male team from Bellarmine High School in San Jose, California. In 2006, Team 1868: "The Space Cookies", an all-female team, was founded in collaboration with the Girl Scouts. In 2012, Team 971: "Spartan Robotics" of Mountain View High School joined the Project, though the team continues to operate at their school. All three teams are highly decorated. All three have won Regional competitions, two have won the FIRST Championship, two have won the Regional Chairman's Award, and one is a Hall of Fame team. The three teams are collectively referred to as "House teams".

The mission of the project is "To create a human, technical, and programmatic resource of robotics capabilities to enable the implementation of future robotic space exploration missions."

== Public-private partnerships ==
The federal government has re-tasked portions of the facility and human resources to support private sector industry, research, and education.

HP became the first corporate affiliate of a new Bio-Info-Nano Research and Development Institute (BIN-RDI); a collaborative venture established by the University of California Santa Cruz and NASA, based at Ames. The Bio|Info|Nano R&D Institute is dedicated to creating scientific breakthroughs by the convergence of biotechnology, information technology, and nanotechnology.

Singularity University hosts its leadership and educational program at the facility. The Organ Preservation Alliance is also headquartered there; the Alliance is a nonprofit organization that works in partnership with the Methuselah Foundation's New Organ Prize "to catalyze breakthroughs on the remaining obstacles towards the long-term storage of organs" to overcome the drastic unmet medical need for viable organs for transplantation. Kleenspeed Technologies is headquartered there.

=== Google ===
On September 28, 2005, Google and Ames Research Center disclosed details to a long-term research partnership. In addition to pooling engineering talent, Google planned to build a 1,000,000-square-foot (9.3 ha) facility on the ARC campus. One of the projects between Ames, Google, and Carnegie Mellon University is the Gigapan Project – a robotic platform for creating, sharing, and annotating terrestrial gigapixel images. The Planetary Content Project seeks to integrate and improve the data that Google uses for its Moon and Mars projects, part of Google Earth. On 4 June 2008, Google announced it had leased 42 acres (170,000 m^{2}) from NASA, at Moffett Field, for use as office space and employee housing.

Construction of the new Google project which is near Google's Googleplex headquarters began in 2013 and has a target opening date in 2015. It is called "Bay View" as it overlooks San Francisco Bay.

In May 2013, Google announced that it was launching the Quantum Artificial Intelligence Lab, to be hosted by ARC. The lab will house a 512 qubit quantum computer from D-Wave Systems, and the Universities Space Research Association (USRA) will invite researchers from around the world to share time on it. The goal being to study how quantum computing might advance machine learning.

Announced on November 10, 2014, Planetary Ventures LLC (a Google subsidiary) will lease the Moffett Federal Airfield from NASA Ames, a site of about 1,000 acres formerly costing the agency $6.3 million annually in maintenance and operation costs. The lease includes the restoration of the site's historic landmark Hangar One, as well as hangars Two and Three. The lease went into effect in March 2015, and spans 60 years.

== Living and working at Ames ==
An official NASA ID is required to enter Ames.

In support of families working at NASA Ames Research Center, the Ames Child Care Center (ACCC) was opened in 1986. The center's goal is to serve the children of NASA employees, civil servants, contractors, and military employees working at Ames Research Center and Moffett Federal Air Field. The ACCC moved to a new on-site location in 2002 as a result of additional funding from NASA and private donors. In 2005, the ACCC opened to the general public, though at increased tuition rates compared to ACCC affiliates.

There are myriad activities both inside the research center and around the base for full-time workers and interns alike. Portions of a fitness trail remain inside the base (also called a Parcourse trail), Sections of it are now inaccessible due to changes in base layout since it was installed.

== See also ==
- Timeline of Ames Research Center
- Mars Climate Modeling Center
- NASA Research Park
- Pleiades (supercomputer)
- National Register of Historic Places listings in Santa Clara County, California
