= Burrow Mump =

Hill in the United Kingdom

Coordinates: 51.06840°N 2.92049°W

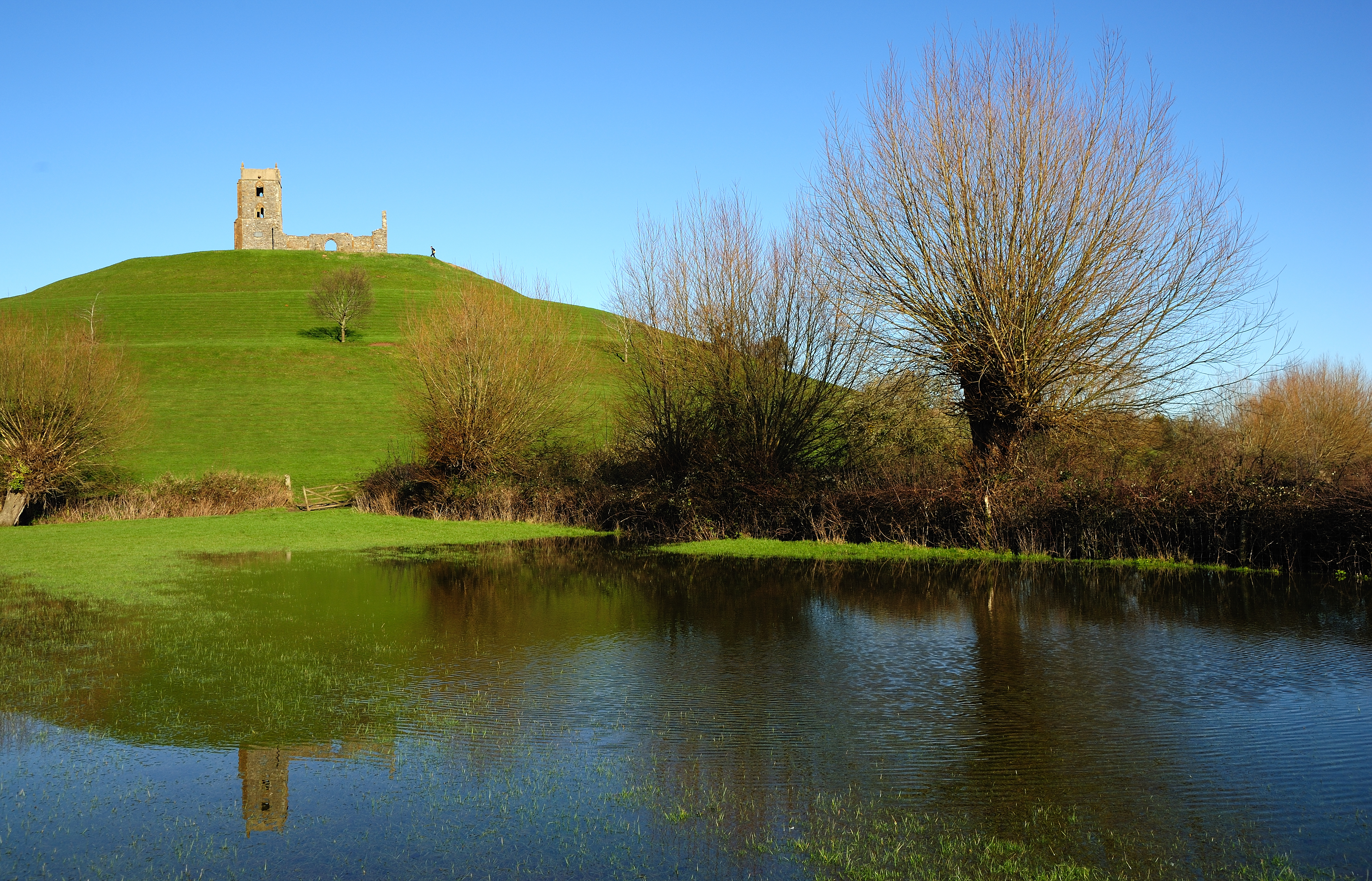
Burrow Mump and St Michael's Church

Burrow Mump is a hill and historic site overlooking Southlake Moor in the village of Burrowbridge within the English county of Somerset. It is a scheduled monument, with a never completed church on top of the hill a Grade II listed building.

The hill stands at a strategic location overlooking the point where the River Tone and the old course of the River Cary join the River Parrett. Although there is some evidence of Roman visitation, the first fortification of the site was the construction of a Norman motte. It has been called King Alfred's Fort, however there is no proof of use by Alfred the Great. A medieval church was built on the hill in the 15th century. The current ruined church on top of the hill was built in 1793. The land and ruin were donated to the National Trust in 1946 as a war memorial.

== Geology ==
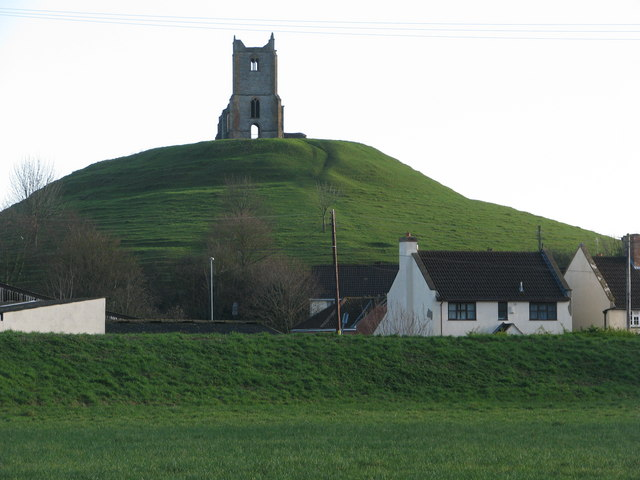
Burrow Mump from the village of Burrowbridge

The hill is 24 metres (79 ft) high, and stands at a strategic point where the River Tone and the old course of the River Cary join the River Parrett, above the surrounding low-lying land of the Somerset Levels. It is made of Triassic sandstone capped by Keuper marl ascribed to the Mercia Mudstone Group.

== Early use ==
Burrow Mump is also known as St Michael's Borough or Tutteyate. Both words 'burrow' and 'mump' mean hill. There is also an alternative translation for the name 'burrows' deriving from 'burh helow' meaning 'the refuge fort' and munp meaning 'a hill' so this becomes 'the refuge fort on the hill', this is very near Lyng which is where one of the Burghal Hideage forts recorded for King Alfred is located.

Archaeological surveys have shown some Roman material including a piece of pottery and coins found nearby which, possibly linked to its situation at a river junction, may indicate its use for trade. Square pits, one of which may have been a well and post holes from the Middle Ages have been identified during excavations, these may have been from an adulterine castle. It is likely that it was a Norman motte with a terraced track that spirals around the hill to reach it. The plateau at the top is 45 metres (150 ft) by 25 metres (80 ft) and along with the scarped top of the slope formed the motte, which may have been formed during The Anarchy between 1135 and 1153. The site has been called King Alfred's Fort, but there is no evidence of it being a fort or having any link with Alfred the Great, apart from its ownership by the nearby Athelney Abbey which he established and was linked to Burrow Mump by a causeway. It may have served as a natural outwork to the defended royal island of Athelney at the end of the 9th century.

Excavations have shown evidence of a 12th-century masonry building on the top of the hill, which may be from the probable adulterine castle. The side of the mound may have been terraced for agricultural use due to much of the surrounding land flooding on a regular basis during the medieval period.

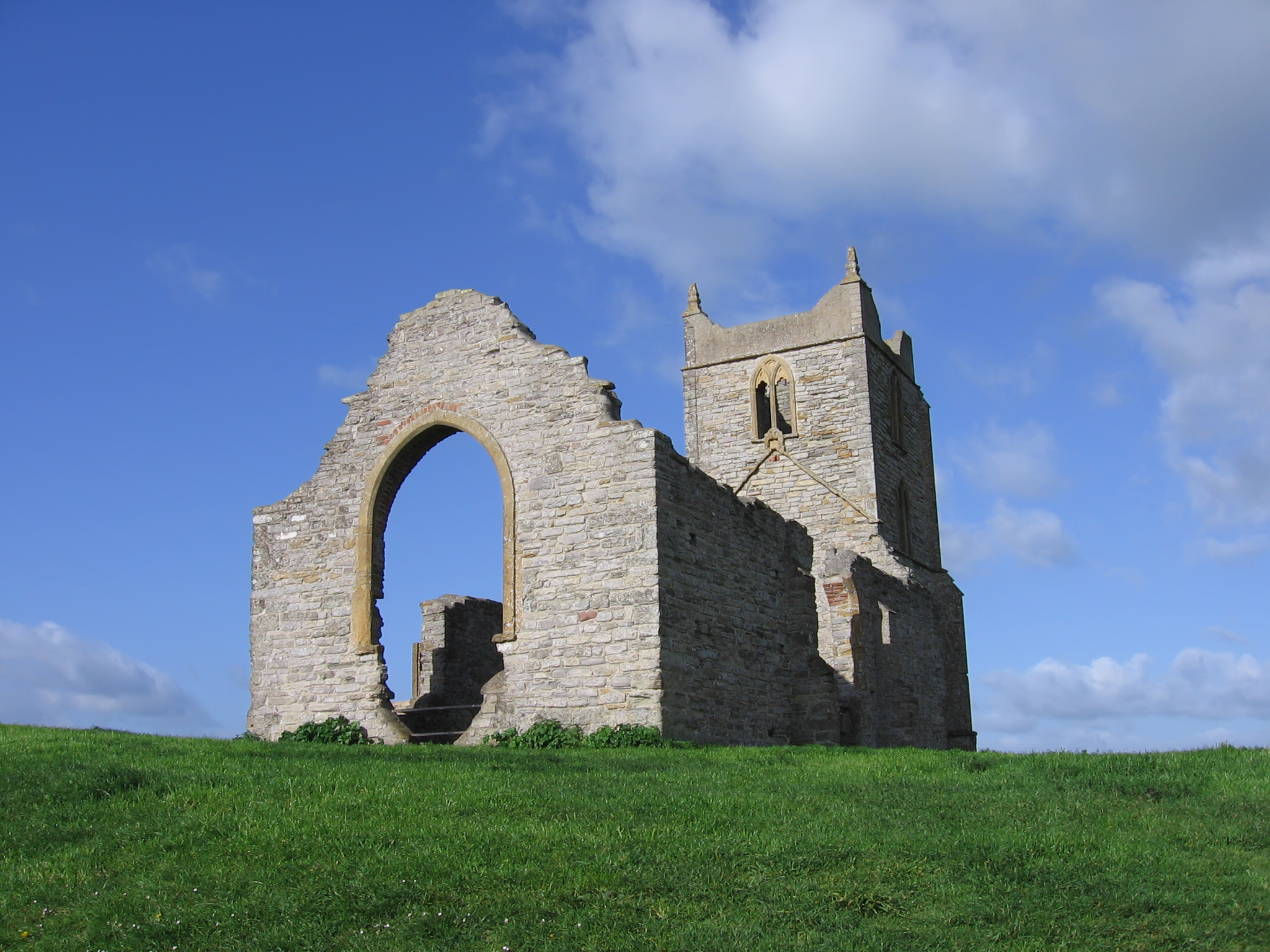
The ruins of St Michael's Church on top of Burrow Mump

The first recorded writing mentioning this site is from William Worcester in about 1480 when he referred to it as Myghell-borough. A medieval church dedicated to St Michael, belonging to the Athelney Abbey, dates from at least the mid-15th century. This formed a sanctuary for royalist troops in 1642 and 1645 during the English Civil War, and a detachment of the king's army occupied it in 1685 during the course of the Monmouth Rebellion.

== 18th century rebuilding ==
In 1793, the church was rebuilt with a west tower, 3-bay nave and south porch, in squared and coursed lias with red brick and Hamstone dressings. The attempt at total rebuilding ended in failure to collect enough money, despite donations from William Pitt the Younger and Admiral Hood, and a church for the community was built instead at the foot of the hill (Burrowbridge) in 1838. In the mid 20th century the ruin on Burrow Mump underwent some repairs to the north west corner.

The ruined church is one of the churches dedicated to St. Michael that falls on a ley line proposed by John Michell of the pseudoscientific Earth Mysteries Movement. Other connected St. Michaels on the ley line include churches built at Othery and Glastonbury Tor. However, Michell's ley line is drawn as a straight line on a map across the counties of Wiltshire, Somerset, Devon and Cornwall linking his sites, and does not take into account the curvature of the Earth. Churches built on hills were also frequently dedicated to St Michael, and it is just a coincidence that a small scattering of churches dedicated to St Michael are found roughly near to the route of his line.

== Memorial ==
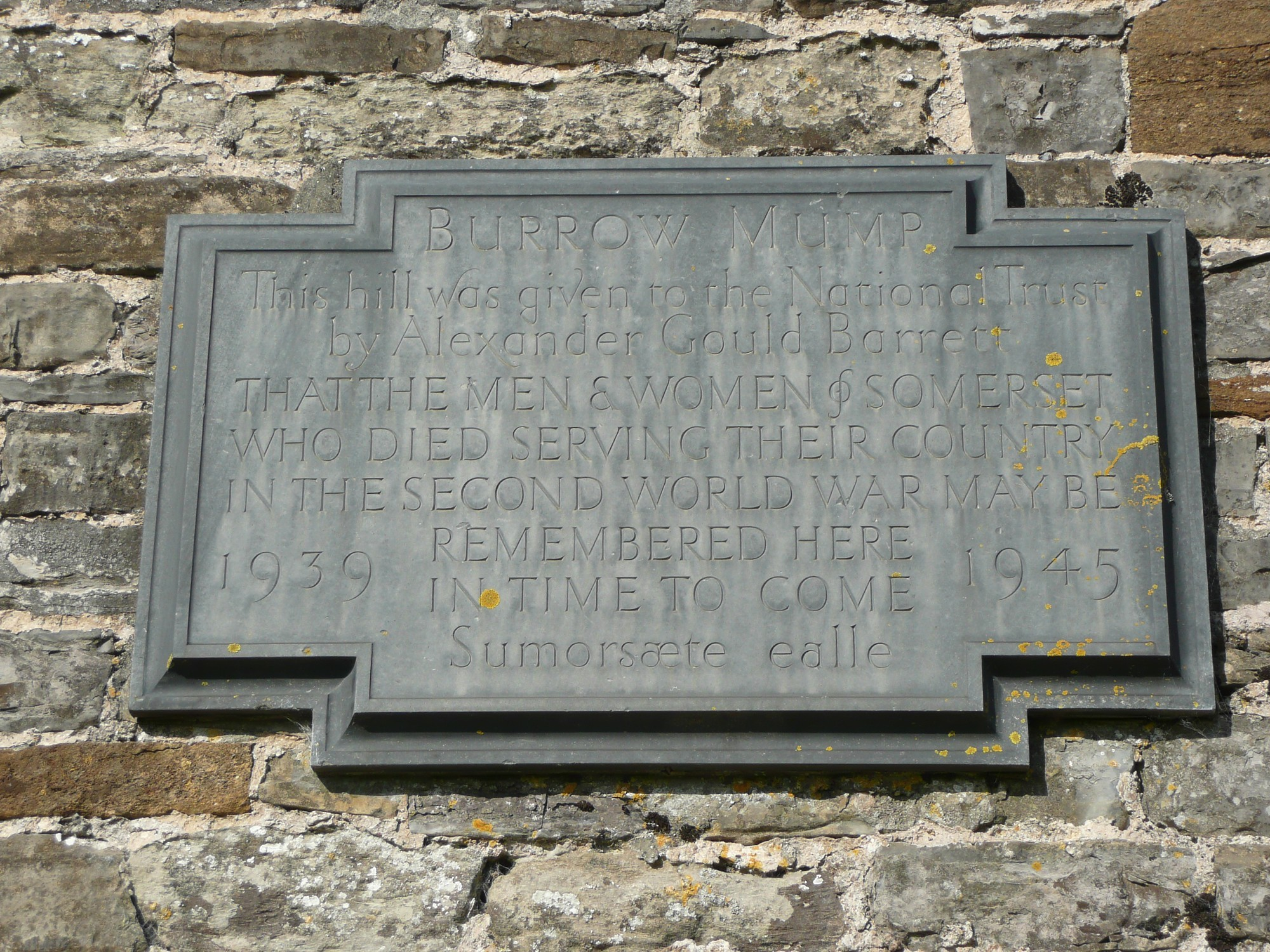
Memorial plaque

The site of 3.573 hectares (8.83 acres) including the hill and ruined church were presented, in 1946, by Major Alexander Gould Barrett, to the National Trust and serve as a memorial to the 11,281 Somerset men who lost their lives during the First and Second World Wars. The National Trust was taken to court for nuisance after soil from Burrow Mump slipped onto a neighbouring farmer's land. The ruin was classified as a Grade II listed building in 1963. It has been a Scheduled monument since 1949.

== Bibliography ==
- Adkins, Lesley and Roy (1992). A field Guide to Somerset Archaeology. Stanbridge: Dovecote press. ISBN 0-946159-94-7.
- Dunning, Robert (1983). A history of Somerset. ISBN 0-85033-461-6.
- Hawkins, Desmond (1982). Avalon and Sedgemoor. ISBN 0-86299-016-5.
- Quinn, Tom (2008). Hidden Britain. New Holland Publishers. pp. 22–23. ISBN 9781847731296.
- Leete-Hodge, Lornie (1985). Curiosities of Somerset. Bodmin: Bossiney Books. ISBN 0-906456-98-3.
- Williams, Robin; Williams, Romey (1992). The Somerset Levels. Ex Libris Press. ISBN 978-0948578380.
