= Alexander Barrett =

Personal information
- Full name: Alexander Barrett
- Born: 17 November 1866; Taunton, England
- Died: 12 March 1954 (aged 87); Taunton, England

Domestic team information
- Years: Team
- 1896: Somerset
- Only FC: 11 June 1896 Somerset v Cambridge University

Career statistics
Competition	First-class
Matches	1
Runs scored	6
Batting average	3
100s/50s	0/0
Top score	6
Catches/stumpings	0/–
- Source: ESPNcricinfo, 20 August 2008

Major Alexander Gould Barrett (17 November 1866 – 12 March 1954) was an Englishman who was a member of the landed gentry. He served in the West Somerset Yeomanry, and was a keen amateur cricketer who played one first-class cricket match for Somerset in 1896, and was president of the club in the early 1930s.

== Life ==
Barrett was born on 17 November 1866, the son of Major William Barrett, who served in the 2nd Somerset Militia, and Maria Herring (née Chard). He attended first Eton College and then Lincoln College, Oxford. He then entered the West Somerset Yeomanry, in which he remained until 1911, when he left having gained the rank of Major.

Barrett made his only first-class appearance for Somerset, playing as a lower-order batsman against Cambridge University at Cambridge in 1896. He scored six runs in his first innings and a duck in his second, both times being bowled by Horace Gray. Three other players made their first-class debuts for Somerset in this match: like Barrett, two of them, Harry MacDonald and Douglas McLean never played first-class cricket again.

Barrett played a lot of cricket for the Somerset Stragglers, an amateur side that played for enjoyment. He also established an annual fixture between a team of his selection "A. G. Barrett's XI" and the Somerset Light Infantry. He acted as President of Somerset County Cricket Club from 1931 to 1932. After outliving his brothers, he inherited the family estate late in life, and donated Burrow Mump to the National Trust in 1946. He died on 12 March 1954 at Musgrove Hospital in Taunton, after a motor accident.
