= NASA Research Park =

Research park near San Jose, California

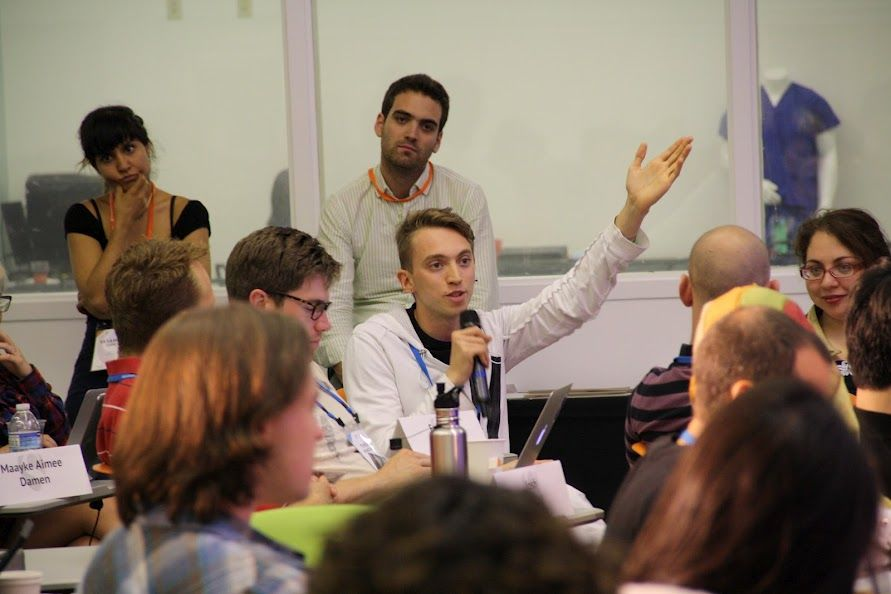
- Federico Pistono speaking at Singularity University, NASA Ames Research Park
- Established: 2002
- Location: San Jose, California, United States
- Operating agency: NASA

NASA Research Park is a research facility under the auspices of NASA located in San Jose, California. It is focused on fostering collaboration among government entities and academic institutions.

== Ames Research Center ==
Congress established the Ames Research Center (Ames) in 1939 as the Ames Aeronautical Laboratory under the National Advisory Committee for Aeronautics (NACA). Ames has grown to occupy approximately 500 acres (2.0 km^{2}) at Moffett Field, adjacent to the Naval Air Station Moffett Field in Santa Clara County, California, in the center of the region that would, in the 1990s, become known as Silicon Valley. In 1958, Congress created NASA with the National Aeronautics and Space Act of 1958, 42 U.S.C. § 2451 et seq. At that time, the Ames Aeronautical Laboratory was renamed to the Ames Research Center and became a NASA field center.

From the 1940s through the 1990s, Ames scientists and engineers conducted flight research in many areas, including variable stability aircraft, guidance and control displays, boundary-layer control, vertical (VTOL) and short takeoff and landing aircraft (STOL), and rotorcraft.

Ames's research had also developed:

- The swept wing design is incorporated into most commercial aircraft.
- The conical camber, as a means of reducing the drag due to lift, increases the range of supersonic aircraft.

Ames developed and operated facilities, including flight simulators and wind tunnels, using computers and the arc jets facility to test materials at very high temperatures, critical to high-speed aircraft development and space vehicle re-entry. One of Ames's contributions to the early space program for human missions was solving the problem of getting astronauts safely back to Earth through the development of the blunt body design for re-entry vehicles.

Ames assisted in the development of Apollo, developed and operated the Pioneer Missions (the first spacecraft to travel through the asteroid belts to observe Jupiter, Saturn, and Venus), and created the tiltrotor aircraft. The diversity of accomplishments led to the focus in the 1990s on Ames becoming the high-tech center of NASA. Ames became known as the Center of Excellence for Information Technologies, researching human-centered computing, a significant interdisciplinary effort to develop means of optimizing the performance of mixed human and computer systems. These new technologies were relevant for aeronautics and space operations, with ground-based operators, astronauts (or pilots/controllers in the air traffic management system), and robots functioning collaboratively to maximize mission science return, productivity, and safety. This human-centered computing focus developed the expertise for Ames to become the lead for all supercomputing in NASA, and in 2005 Ames operated the world's second fastest supercomputer, partnered with Silicon Graphics and Intel.

In the 1990s, following its historical experience in life and space sciences, Ames developed a new focused program called "Astrobiology" to search for the origins of life in the universe. Ames led NASA's Kepler Mission, a spacecraft designed to find Earth-sized planets in other galaxies that may be in or near habitable zones. Ames also developed SOFIA, the new Stratospheric Observatory for Infrared Astronomy, using a Boeing 747 aircraft that studied the universe from 2010 to 2022 in the infrared spectrum.

Concurrent with innovations in science and technology, Ames has created partnerships with universities and industry, both onsite and in distance collaborations. The opportunity for this new partnering became available in the early 1990s, with the potential for R&D partners to move into the property obtained from the transfer of Navy Moffett Field land to NASA.

From its establishment in 1939, Ames shared the land, generally known as Moffett Field, with the United States Navy, jointly using the major airfield on the property. In the 1930s, the Navy developed Moffett Field originally for the home of the famous "Lighter than Air Era of American Military History," housing and operating large-scale airships. Through the years, several military organizations, including the United States Air Force, used the Moffett Field facilities, and in the late 1980s, the Navy operated the base.

With the enactment of the Base Realignment and Closure Act in 1991, Congress directed the Navy to close and vacate the Naval Air Station at Moffett Field. Under the Federal Property Administrative Services Act of 1949, 40 U.S.C. §471, NASA negotiated custody of most of the Navy property, with the support of the local governments surrounding Moffett Field and the U.S. Congressmen from the area, especially Representative Norman Mineta. The property was transferred to NASA and disestablished the Naval Air Station Moffett Field. The United States Department of Defense retained control of 57 hectares (140 acres) of military housing at Moffett Field. In 1994, the Department of the Navy transferred approximately 600 hectares (1,500 acres) to NASA. This transfer created a unique opportunity for NASA to provide stewardship for the entire 800-hectare (2,000-acre) site, except the military housing.

Before obtaining control of Moffett Field, NASA prepared the Moffett Field Comprehensive Use Plan (C.U.P.) to implement its management program for the newly expanded Ames. An Environmental Assessment (E.A.) and Finding of No Significant Impact accompanied the plan. The E.A. established under the C.U.P. allows for the development of up to approximately 102,000 square meters (1.1 million square feet) of new construction.

== NASA Research Park ==
In November 1996, the neighboring cities of Mountain View and Sunnyvale formed the Community Advisory Committee to study and provide input to Ames about the best reuses of Moffett Field. Ames developed a six-point initiative, which outlined program goals and reuse concepts for the development of the former Navy base that focused on university and industry building on NASA property as R&D collaborative partners. In 1997, after extensive public outreach and public meetings, the final report advisory committee endorsed NASA's six-point initiative, which established the plans to develop what became the NASA Research Park.

Ames leaders reviewed studies of research parks worldwide and continued to work with the neighboring communities in preparing its preferred development plan. In 1998, Ames and the cities of Sunnyvale and Mountain View signed a memorandum of understanding to work jointly on development. Also, several major universities were involved in planning their potential roles in development. In mid-1998, Ames leaders presented their plan to NASA headquarters and secured approval to proceed.

On December 8, 1998, NASA unveiled its visionary concept for a shared-use R&D and education campus for collaborations among government, industry, academia, and non-profit organizations at a national press conference with NASA Administrator Dan Goldin. Over the next year, Memorandums of Understanding for planning development were signed with the University of California, Santa Cruz, Carnegie Mellon University, San Jose State University, and Foothill-DeAnza Community College.

In addition to federal, state, and community leaders inputs, Ames worked closely with several economic development and industry organizations in focused groups by industry: information technology, bio-technology, and others to understand the needs of the Silicon Valley high-tech industry. In 1999, this vision was outlined in an Economic Development Concept Workbook, which won the 2000 American Planning Association Award.

=== Development ===
NASA's goal is to develop a world-class, shared-use research and development campus in association with government entities, academia, industry, and nonprofits. The NADP/EIS provides a framework to guide the use, renovation, management, and development of facilities at Ames over the next 20 years to achieve that goal. The NRP supports NASA's overall mission in three areas: advancing NASA's research leadership; facilitating science and technology education; and creating a unique community of researchers, students, and educators.

NASA's recent vision and mission statements recognize that from NASA, industry, and universities will come integration of these segments, making the most of their attributes—NASA's focus on high-risk, long-term research; industry's ability to react quickly with applied technologies; and university expertise in educating and providing a workforce for the future.

The Vision for Space Exploration (VSE) announced in 2004, required NASA to partner with all kinds of relevant organizations to sustain their long-term vision. The NRP had and is continuing to bring together diverse partners, assisting the pursuit of the VSE and other NASA programs. Through the interaction of academia, industry, and non-profit organizations at a federal laboratory, a unique community of researchers, students, and educators with a shared mission to advance human knowledge was created. This was the goal of the NRP.

In October 2011, the U.S. President issued a Presidential Memorandum "Accelerating Technology Transfer and Commercialization of Federal Research in Support of High-Growth Businesses" that directs federal agencies to "Facilitate Commercialization through Local and Regional Partnerships". It was also mentioned that "Agencies must take steps to enhance successful technology innovation networks by fostering increased Federal laboratory engagement with external partners, including universities, industry consortia, economic development entities, and State and local governments." and "to use existing authorities, such as Enhanced Use Leasing or Facility Use Agreements, to locate applied research and business support programs, such as incubators and research parks, on or near Federal laboratories and other research facilities to further technology transfer and commercialization. I encourage agencies with Federal laboratories and other research facilities to engage in public-private partnerships in those technical areas of importance to the agency's mission with external partners to strengthen the commercialization activities in their local region." NRP has implemented this directive through its program of onsite and offsite industry and academic partnerships.

=== Awards ===
2003: General Services Administration Award. The U.S. General Services Administration (GSA) awarded its Seventh Annual GSA Achievement Award for Real Property Innovation to NASA for its NASA Ames Development Plan that established NRP. In making the agency's award, GSA Administrator Stephan A. Perry stated that "as our country changes, our mandate for excellence is creating an every more responsive government to serve our citizens better...(the) NASA Ames Development Plan will provide an integrated, dynamic research and development community."

2015: Best Civic Project. The San Jose/Silicon Valley Business Journal gave its top "Best Civic Project of the Year" award to NASA and Google for their landmark ground lease of the 1,000-acre Moffett Federal Airfield.

2015: Bright Idea. Under the Federal Jurisdiction, the "2015 Bright Idea" award was awarded to NASA Research Park.

== Key partners ==
=== Google ===
On September 30, 2005, NASA and Google announced a Memorandum of Understanding (MOU) at a national press conference to pursue research and development (R&D) collaborations with Ames in the areas of large-scale data management, massively distributed computing, Bio-Info-Nano Convergence, and R&D activities to encourage the entrepreneurial space industry and plan construction of 1,000,000 square feet (93,000 m^{2}) of new facilities. In 2006, NASA and Google signed a major Space Act Agreement for Research and Development Collaboration with planned new R&D annexes being added. In 2007, Google announced its Lunar X PRIZE, a $30 million international competition to safely land a robot on the surface of the Moon, travel 500 meters over the lunar surface and send images and data back to the Earth. In 2008, Google Incorporated and NASA signed a long-term ground lease for 42 acres in NRP. The San Jose Business Journal awarded the NASA/Google ground lease its "Deal of the Year" award in 2008. In late 2012, Google broke ground to construct up to 1.2 million square feet in new office/R&D facilities near its Googleplex in Mountain View, California. Google released details of the planned construction of its new campus to Vanity Fair in February 2013 and simultaneously issued a press statement confirming construction plans to the media. The announcement has been reported internationally, including the Wall Street Journal in the United States.

=== Carnegie Mellon University – Silicon Valley Campus ===
In 2002, Carnegie Mellon University established a branch campus in Silicon Valley to connect its distinctive technology education programs to the innovative business community at one of the centers of modern technological progress. The university's Silicon Valley Campus offers master's programs in Software Engineering, Software Management, Engineering & Technology Innovation Management, and Information Technology, as well as a bicoastal Ph.D. program in Electrical and Computer Engineering with a focus on Mobility offered in conjunction with the new CyLab Mobility Research Center. Over 600 graduate-level students have received degrees at the Silicon Valley campus located in two historic buildings at NRP.
