= Harry MacDonald (cricketer) =

English cricketer

Harry Lindsay Somerled MacDonald (2 August 1861 – 15 August 1936) played first-class cricket for Somerset in 1896. He was born in Westminster, London and died at Bathford, Somerset.

== Military career ==
MacDonald was the only son of Lieutenant-Colonel William MacDonald of the 93rd (Sutherland Highlanders) Regiment of Foot. He himself was commissioned as a second lieutenant in the Fife division of the Royal Artillery in 1879. In 1883, he was promoted from lieutenant to captain in the fourth brigade of the Scottish Division of the Royal Artillery. He resigned his commission in 1887 and resigned from the reserve of officers in 1892.

== Cricket career ==
MacDonald played club cricket in the Bath area of Somerset in the 1890s. His one first-class match came in a very weak Somerset side in the match against Cambridge University in 1896: he scored 0 in the first innings and top-scored with an unbeaten 22 in the second innings, taking two catches in Cambridge's first innings. He was one of four Somerset players making their first-class cricket debuts in this match; like him, two of the others, Douglas McLean and Alexander Barrett, never played first-class cricket again.

== Outside cricket ==
MacDonald married Lilian Margaret Coke of Brimington Hall, Derbyshire in 1887 and settled at Bathford, near Bath.
