= Human Systems Integration Division =

The Human Systems Integration Division (HSI) are offices and laboratories within the National Aeronautics and Space Administration, whose function is focused within investigation to application of new scientific knowledge relevant to human centred functioning in order to benefit the objectives of the NASA space program. The division seeks to advance human-centered design and operations of complex aerospace systems through experimentation relevant to human performance and human-automation interaction, to make improvements in the safety, efficiency and probability of success of missions.

== Objectives ==
The division has three strategic goals:

1. Design human-centered technologies, evaluation techniques, and organizational practices to improve aviation safety and the performance of crewed and uncrewed aircraft.
2. Design and develop increasingly intelligent systems and augmentative technologies to enable working collaboration between human agents and autonomous systems.
3. Enable lunar and deep space exploration by studying human performance in space and developing technologies to improve increasingly autonomous astronaut operations.

== Organization ==
The division is comprised (May 16, 2011 information) of the following groupings:

- [Advanced Controls and Displays]+ [Airspace Operations Laboratory (AOL)]+ [Ames Flight Deck Display Research Group]+ [Automation Interaction Design and Evaluation Group]+[Aviation Safety Reporting System (ASRS)]+[Aviation Training Research Lab]
- [Cognition Lab]+ [Cognitive Performance in Aviation Operations and Training]
- [Distributed Team Decision Making]
- [Emergency and Abnormal Situations Study]
- [Flight Cognition]
- [Human-Centered Systems Lab (HCSL)] + [Human-Computer Interaction Group (HCI)]
- [Integrated Safety Data for Strategic Response (ISDSR) Group]+ [Intelligent Spacecraft Interface Systems (ISIS)]
- [Man Machine Integration Design and Analysis (MIDAS)]
- [Operational Based Vision Assessment]
- [Professional Pilot Training Lab]+ [Psychophysiological Research Facility]
- [Spatial Auditory Display Laboratory]
- [TH Division]
- [Vision Science and Technology]+ [Visuomotor Control]

== History ==
- 1960s: Ames engineers built a human-rated, six-degree-of-freedom simulator to test rotorcraft. The division also developed a spacecraft cockpit at the end of a centrifuge arm that generates G-forces similar to those experienced during spaceflight launch.
- 1970s: HSI established the Aviation Safety Reporting System (ASRS) in 1976. In the same decade, the division developed Crew Resource Management (CRM), a set of procedures followed by aircraft crew to ensure fundamental human factors principles are employed for safety.
- 1980s: The division developed the NASA Task Load Index (TLX), a subjective workload assessment tool to evaluate operator workload in human-machine interactions. It measures workload based on six factors: mental demand, physical demand, temporal demand, performance, effort, and frustration.
- 1990s: The Vision Group developed a digital video assessment metric incorporating human visual processing factors such as light adaptation, spatial filtering, and contrast masking. Patented in 1995, this method helped evaluate compression artifacts and improve image compression by removing invisible distortions while maintaining high quality.
- 2000s: The Human Vibration Laboratory was established to study how spacecraft launch vibrations affect astronauts' visual, cognitive, and manual performance, leading to the proposal of strobing cockpit displays in sync with vibrations. This technique significantly improved display readability in simulations and led to a new patent.
- 2010s: The Human-Computer Interaction Group created planning tools for Mars missions and an advanced scheduler, Score, used for coordinating astronaut activities on the International Space Station (ISS). Score enables real-time, collaborative scheduling for NASA and international partners. Playbook, a later development, allows astronauts to manage schedules, log mission activities, and access procedures directly from mobile devices and computers with minimal training.

== See also ==
- Controlled Impact Demonstration
- Decision making
- Decision analysis
- Decision support system
- Decision theory
- Decision tree
- Effect of spaceflight on the human body
- Flight simulator
- Human-machine interaction
- Human machine interface
- Human-machine system
- Human spaceflight
- Motion simulator
- National Advisory Committee for Aeronautics

== Sources ==
National Aeronautics and Space Administration:Human Systems Integration Division-History (Curator: Phil So) retrieved 10:40(UTC) 24.10.2011
