= Henry MacDonald =

Scottish recipient of the Victoria Cross

- Born: 28 May 1823; Inverness, Scotland
- Died: 15 February 1893 (aged 69); Glasgow, Scotland
- Burial place: Western Necropolis, Glasgow
- Military career
- Allegiance: United Kingdom
- Branch: British Army
- Rank: Captain
- Units: Royal Engineers
- Conflicts: Crimean War
- Awards: Victoria Cross; Distinguished Conduct Medal; Légion d'honneur (France)

Henry MacDonald VC (28 May 1823 – 15 February 1893) was a Scottish recipient of the Victoria Cross, the highest and most prestigious award for gallantry in the face of the enemy that can be awarded to British and Commonwealth forces.

== Details ==
MacDonald was 31 years old, and a colour sergeant in the Corps of Royal Engineers, British Army during the Crimean War when the following deed took place for which he was awarded the VC.

On 19 April 1855 at Sebastopol, Crimea, Colour-Sergeant MacDonald acted with great gallantry when engaged in effecting a lodgement in the enemy's rifle-pits in front of the left advance of the Right Attack. Subsequently, when the Engineer officers were badly wounded Colour-Sergeant MacDonald took command and he determinedly persisted in carrying on the sap notwithstanding the repeated attacks of the enemy.

== Further information ==
He later achieved the rank of honorary captain.

== The medal ==
This medal is now in the care of Glasgow Museums and is in open storage at the Glasgow Museums Resource Centre, 200 Woodhead Road, Glasgow. These stores are open to the public with daily tours and the medal can be viewed on request.
