= Subsonic and transonic wind tunnel =

Type of wind tunnell

Transonic wind tunnels, between Mach 0.75 and Mach 1.2 (920 and 1,500 km/h; 570 and 910 mph; 260 and 410 m/s), are designed on similar principles as subsonic tunnels but present additional challenges, primarily due to the reflection of shock waves from the walls of the test section. To mitigate this, perforated or slotted walls are used to reduce shock reflection. In transonic testing, both Mach number and Reynolds number are critical and must be properly simulated. This often necessitates the use of large-scale facilities and pressurized or cryogenic wind tunnels. These tunnels are crucial for studying aerodynamic properties of objects at speeds approaching and surpassing the speed of sound, such as high-speed aircraft and spacecraft during critical phases of flight.

== Closed wind tunnel ==
Schematic of a closed (return-flow) wind tunnel

In a return-flow wind tunnel, the return duct must be properly designed to reduce the pressure losses and to ensure smooth flow in the test section.

== Transonic tunnel ==
High subsonic wind tunnels, between Mach 0.4 and 0.75, and transonic wind tunnels, between Mach 0.75 and 1.2, are designed on the same principles as the subsonic wind tunnels. Testing at transonic speeds presents additional problems, mainly due to the reflection of the shock waves from the walls of the test section. Therefore, perforated or slotted walls are required to reduce shock reflection from the walls. Since important viscous or inviscid interactions occur (such as shock waves or boundary layer interaction) both Mach and Reynolds number are important and must be properly simulated. Large-scale facilities and pressurized or cryogenic wind tunnels are used.

== See also ==
- Wind tunnel
- Supersonic wind tunnel
- Hypersonic wind tunnel
- Gustave Eiffel
- National Aerospace Laboratory, Netherlands
- Calspan
