= Henry McDonald (engineer) =

Aeronautical engineer (1937–2021)

Dr. Henry "Harry" McDonald DSc FREng (14 January 1937 – 25 May 2021) was a Scottish-American aeronautical engineer specializing in Computational Fluid Dynamics and Director of the NASA Ames Research Center in Moffett Field, California from 1996 to 2002.

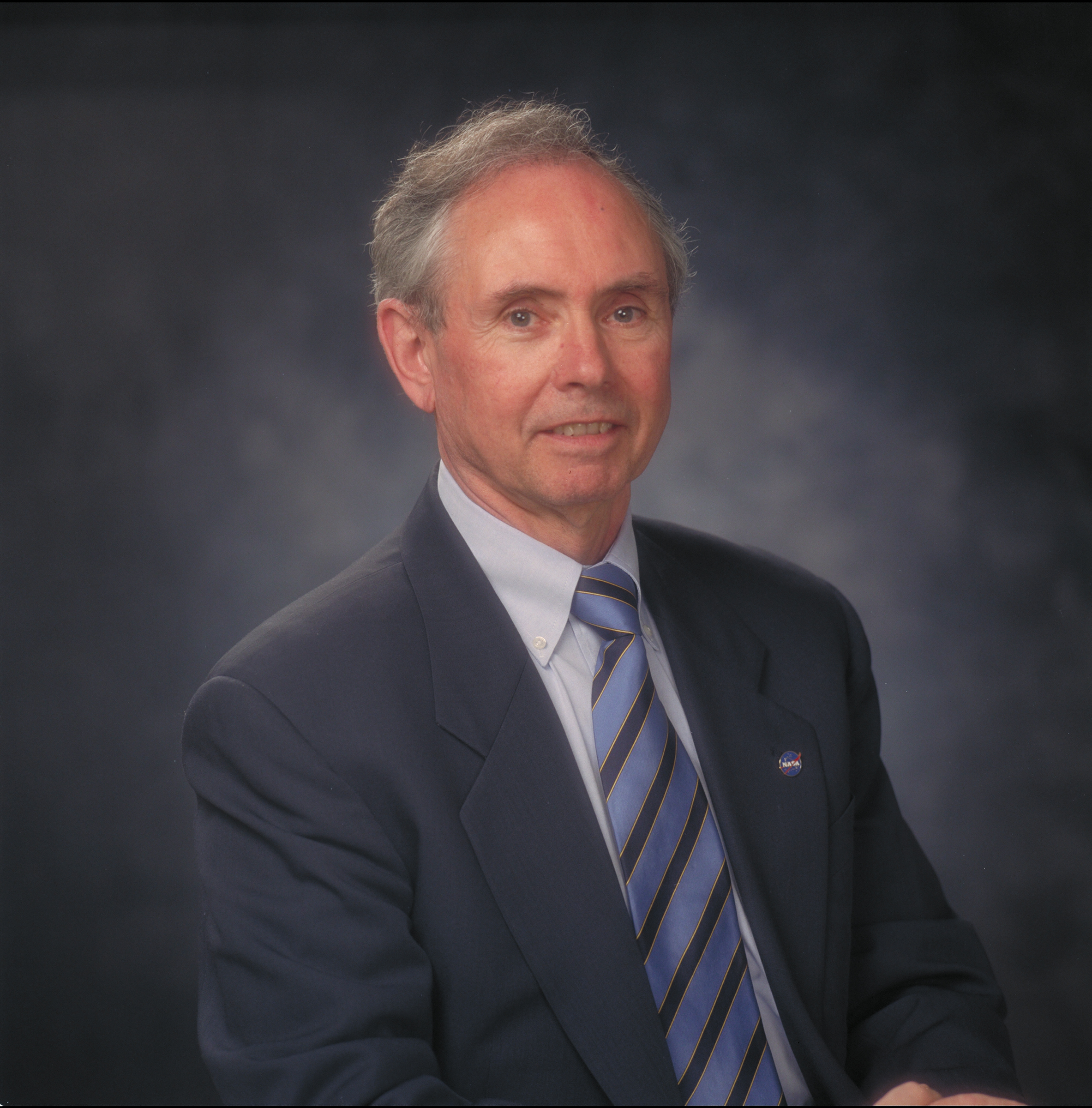

== Biography ==
McDonald was born in Glasgow, Scotland on 24 January 1937 but was moved out of the city due to the Clydebank Blitz. He was raised in Girvan, studied aeronautical engineering at the University of Glasgow, and trained as pilot with the Royal Air Force Universities of Glasgow and Strathclyde Air Squadron. He emigrated to the United States in 1965 with his wife June Seaton McDonald M.D., where he lived and worked until his death in 2021. The Henry McDonald Memorial Fund was established in 2021 to support underprivileged and exceptional engineering students at the University of Glasgow to help eliminate barriers facing Scotland's best and brightest.

== Career ==
McDonald worked in the U.K. aerospace industry on a number of both civil and military aircraft before immigrating to Connecticut, where he became a U.S. citizen. He was a staff member in large corporate research laboratory, United Technologies Research Center, where he concentrated on turbomachinery and what eventually became known as Computational Fluid Dynamics.

In 1976 McDonald was founder, president, and chief executive officer of Scientific Research Associates Inc. (SRA), a small research and development company in Glastonbury, Connecticut. He managed the company's computational physics laboratory which specialized in aero-, hydro- and gas dynamics, optical electronics, and biomedical research. McDonald actively participated in Connecticut's high-technology economic development policy, and SRA's economic development contributions were acknowledged by the state with the Governor's Innovation Award. McDonald was co-inventor of a patented novel ultra-high frequency ventilator, which provides life support to critically ill patients with Adult Respiratory Distress Syndrome. McDonald was awarded the Small Businessman of the Year Award for High Technology by the State of Connecticut for this achievement.

McDonald held a number of academic posts at Pennsylvania State University and Mississippi State before accepting an Interagency Personnel Appointment at NASA as Center Director of NASA Ames Research Laboratory. McDonald was charged "to take our center into the 21st century and leverage the fact that Ames is located in one of the most innovative and entrepreneurial regions in the world, Silicon Valley." McDonald provided leadership and technical insight as the Center re-invented itself in the late 1990s, helping Ames the 1500 civil servants and 3000 on-site contractor staff see the center as a future driver within NASA. McDonald secured the lead NASA center role for Ames in astrobiology, air traffic management, information technology, and nanotechnology, hiring Nobel laurate Dr. Baruch Blumberg as the inaugural Director of the NASA Astrobiology Institute launched the year prior. McDonald also initiated the University Affiliated Research Center and the NASA Research Park, which created flourishing partnerships of enduring strategic importance to NASA Ames.

McDonald did notable work as a forensic engineer throughout his career. He asked to assist the NASA team investigating the Challenger disaster. After the ascent anomalies Columbia experienced on 23 July 1999, STS-93, McDonald was appointed to lead the Space Shuttle Independent Assessment Team (SIAT), a special independent investigation into Space Shuttle anomalies, and civilian and military aeronautical experience. The SIAT report identified many of the same systemic issues subsequently identified in the Space Shuttle Columbia disaster and later cited by the Columbia Accident Investigation Board. During his stay at NASA, McDonald also led an independent investigation of a V-22 Osprey accident as chair of the Tiltrotor Aeromechanical Phenomena Assessment Panel, reporting 17 high priority and 11 other safety and stability recommendations to the Assistant Secretary of Defense. Subsequently, McDonald became a member of the Lockheed Martin team investigating a Titan motor failure.

McDonald and Roger Briley pioneered the Block Implicit Method, a scheme capable of obtaining numerical solutions to systems of nonlinear multidimensional partial differential equations. An implicit finite-difference method for the multidimensional Navier-Stokes equations was developed to exploit the favorable stability properties of implicit methods and thereby increase computational efficiency by taking large time step. The method consists of a generalized implicit scheme which has been linearized by Taylor expansion about the solution at the known time level to produce a set of coupled linear difference equations which are valid for a given time step. McDonald's academic work was published widely in the AIAA Journal, the Journal of Fluid Mechanics, and elsewhere.

== Memberships and awards ==
McDonald was a member of the National Academy of Engineering from 2000, a Fellow of the Royal Academy of Engineering, a Fellow and Honorary Member of the American Society of Mechanical Engineers, a Fellow of Royal Aeronautical Society (RAeS), and a Fellow and Honorary Fellow in the American Institute of Aeronautics and Astronautics.

The RAeS presented its 2009 Gold Medal Award to McDonald for work of an outstanding nature in aerospace. The event marked the centennial of the RAeS' first Gold Medal which was awarded to the Wright Brothers in 1909.

McDonald was awarded the NASA Distinguished Service Medal in 2000, "...the highest award which may be bestowed by the National Aeronautics and Space Administration of the United States."

In 2009, McDonald was inducted into the NASA Ames Hall of Fame for providing, "...exceptional leadership and keen technical insight to NASA Ames as the Center re-invented itself in the late 1990s."
