= Prem Ratan Dhan Payo =

2015 Indian film by Sooraj Barjatya

- Theatrical release poster
- Directed by: Sooraj R. Barjatya
- Screenplay by: Sooraj R. Barjatya
- Produced by: Kamal Kumar Barjatya; Rajkumar Barjatya; Ajit Kumar Barjatya
- Starring: Salman Khan; Sonam Kapoor; Neil Nitin Mukesh; Anupam Kher
- Cinematography: V. Manikandan
- Edited by: Sanjay Sankla
- Music by: Songs: Himesh Reshammiya; Score: Sanjoy Chowdhury; Himesh Reshammiya
- Production company: Rajshri Productions
- Distributed by: Fox Star Studios
- Release date: 12 November 2015 (India)
- Running time: 164 minutes
- Country: India
- Language: Hindi
- Budget: ₹60–900 million
- Box office: est. ₹4.32 billion

Prem Ratan Dhan Payo (transl. I found a jewel called love) is a 2015 Indian Hindi-language romantic family drama film written and directed by Sooraj Barjatya. Produced by Rajshri Productions, it stars Salman Khan and Sonam Kapoor. Neil Nitin Mukesh, Anupam Kher, Swara Bhaskar, Armaan Kohli, Deepak Dobriyal and Aashika Bhatia play supporting roles. It is the fourth collaboration between Barjatya and Khan after their previous films Maine Pyar Kiya (1989), Hum Aapke Hain Koun..! (1994), and Hum Saath Saath Hain (1999), and it is the second collaboration between Khan and Kapoor after Saawariya (2007).

The film was released worldwide on 12 November 2015 during Diwali season. With a worldwide gross of ₹432 crore, it is the second highest-grossing Bollywood film of 2015. The core plot of the film is reportedly inspired by the 2012 South Korean film Masquerade, which was itself loosely based on the 1894 novel The Prisoner of Zenda by Anthony Hope.

== Plot ==
Yuvraj Vijay Singh, a wealthy crown prince of Pritampur is soon to be crowned King. He's engaged to Rajkumari Maithili Devi, a princess of the royal family of the neighbouring kingdom Devgarh. However, due to his stiff, stubborn nature, Vijay faces many issues with Maithili and his siblings. His rich half-sisters, Rajkumari Chandrika and Rajkumari Radhika, live in a separate rented bungalow outside the royal palace with Chandrika working as an accounts head in a municipal school, and have filed a case against Vijay for a share in the royal property, because they felt their mother (a poet and later mistress to the late King) was wronged by the Queen when she disgraced her in the presence of all of the King's children. Furthermore, Chandrika and Maithili, who were best friends during school times, find their friendship shattered owing to her engagement with Vijay. Similarly, his half brother Yuvraj Ajay Singh vows vengeance and has been wanting to kill him and take the crown for himself. He enlists the help of his manager Chirag Singh and Vijay's secretary Sameera. Chirag misguidings Ajay at every step while betraying him behind his back. Vijay barely escapes an assassination plan coordinated by Ajay and Chirag to kill him but is badly injured. He is hidden in a secret chamber maintained by two doctors.

Meanwhile, Vijay's doppelganger Prem Raghuvanshi aka Prem Dilwale, a love guru, a perky, lively and carefree stage actor who falls in love with Princess Maithili, reaches Pritampur to meet her along with his friend Kanhaiya. At a bus stop, the Security Head of Pritampur Palace, Sanjay, notices him by chance and takes him to Diwan Sahab. Upon witnessing the striking resemblance between Prem and Yuvraj Vijay, Diwan asks Prem to take Yuvraj Vijay's place while Yuvraj recovers from coma. Prem acts as Yuvraj Vijay but with his simple, caring nature, he impresses Maithili who earlier wanted to break up with Vijay and falls in love with Prem unknowingly. Prem also attempts to reconcile with Vijay's sisters by bringing them back to the royal palace; he prepares legal documents handing over all of the royal family's properties to them. His half-sisters are so moved by this gesture that, with a little push from Maithili, they eventually have a change of heart and decline to deprive the prince of his fortune and reconcile with him as his sisters.

Meanwhile, Yuvraj Ajay and Chirag find out that Prem is only playing the part of the prince and thus they kidnap the real Vijay. Chirag decides to double cross Ajay, as he frees Vijay and feeds him false information to pit him against Ajay and Prem. Vijay and Ajay get involved in a sword fight when Prem and Kanhaiya intervene and clear the confusion. Chirag tries to shoot them down but falls to his death. Ajay regrets his deeds and Vijay reconciles with him. Maithili is shocked to know the truth about Prem not being Yuvraj Vijay after Prem has left to return to his home and is left heartbroken. In the end, the royal family reaches Prem's house to reunite Prem and Maithili, and they happily marry along with Kanhaiyya and Sameera.

== Cast ==
- Salman Khan in a dual role as
  - Prem Raghuvanshi aka Prem Dilwale: An Ayodhya based love guru; Kanhaiya's friend; Maithili's husband
  - Yuvraj Vijay Singh: Crown prince of Pritampur; Dhananjay and Nandita's son; Ajay, Chandrika and Radhika's half-brother; Maithili's ex-fiancé
- Sonam Kapoor as Rajkumari Maithili Devi Singh Raghuvanshi: Crown princess of neighbouring kingdom Devgarh; Chandrika's friend; Vijay's ex-fiancé; Prem's wife
- Neil Nitin Mukesh as Yuvraj Ajay Singh: Dhananjay and Bhagwanti's son; Vijay's half-brother and enemy; also Chandrika and Radhika's half-brother
- Anupam Kher as Jagdish "Bapu" Diwan / Diwan Sahab
- Armaan Kohli as Chirag Singh: The Royal family's business manager
- Deepak Dobriyal as Kanhaiya "Musoorie" Chaturvedi: Prem's friend; Sameera's husband
- Samaira Rao as Sameera Sharma: Chirag and Ajay's agent; Kanhaiya's wife
- Swara Bhaskar as Rajkumari Chandrika Singh: Dhananjay and Sangeeta's elder daughter; Vijay and Ajay's half-sister; Radhika's sister; Maithili's friend
- Aashika Bhatia as Rajkumari Radhika Singh: Dhananjay and Sangeeta's younger daughter; Vijay and Ajay's half-sister; Chandrika's sister
- Sameer Dharmadhikari as Raja Dhananjay Maan Singh: King of Pritampur; Bhagwanti, Nandita and Sangeeta's husband; Vijay, Ajay, Chandrika and Radhika's father
- Lata Sabharwal as Sangeeta Devi Singh: A singer and courtesan of the Royal Family; Dhananjay's mistress turned third wife; Chandrika and Radhika's mother
- Karuna Pandey as Maharani Bhagwanti Singh: Queen of Pritampur; Dhananjay's second wife; Ajay's mother
- Namrata Thapa as NGO Worker
- Yuvika Chaudhary as Unknown Girl
- Bikramjeet Kanwarpal as Estate Agent
- Alok Pandey as Manish "Monty" Verma
- Deepraj Rana as Sanjay: Head of security of the Royal Palace
- Sanjay Mishra as Gopinath Chaubey: Head of the drama troupe
- Mukesh S Bhatt as Chuttan
- S M Zaheer as Dr. Farooq Ansari
- Micky Makhijja as Dr. Pankaj Nambiar
- Manoj Joshi as Bhuvnesh Bhandari: Advocate of Pritampur royal family
- Suhasini Mulay as Savitri "Dadisa" Devi: Maithili's grandmother
- Md Jakir Hossain as Prem's Friend
- Yash Abbad as Rajkumar of Rajasthan

== Production ==
=== Development ===
It was announced in June 2013 by Salman Khan and Sooraj Barjatya and pre-production work of the film began in January 2014 until June 2014. It was titled Bade Bhaiya and later changed to Prem Ratan Dhan Payo, inspired by the well-known Hindu hymn "Payo Ji Maine Ram Ratan Dhan Payo" of Mirabai. Himesh Reshammiya, V. Manikandan and Sanjay Sankala roped as a music composer, cinematographer and editor in the film.

=== Casting ===
Initially, Anushka Sharma, Sonakshi Sinha, Kareena Kapoor, Daisy Shah and Deepika Padukone were rumoured to play leading ladies but they turned down the offer. Finally, Sonam Kapoor was signed on to play a leading lady in this film which marked her second film with Khan after 2007 film Saawariya, helmed by Sanjay Leela Bhansali. Neil Nitin Mukesh, Anupam Kher, Armaan Kohli, Deepak Dobriyal, Samaira Rao and Swara Bhaskar were signed on to play supporting characters. Amrita Rao was considered to play Khan's half-sister and her role went to Bhaskar. Previously, Rao acted in Vivah.

=== Filming ===
Filming began after 1000 days of preparation on 26 June 2014 and wrapped on 2 September 2015 after 200 days of shoot. It was shot in Rajkot, Gondal, Udaipur, Athirapally Falls and Mumbai. It was shot at several extravagant locations across India. From grand sets to elaborate costumes, Prem Ratan Dhan Payo was undeniably a visual delight for all the viewers. The makers of the film released a 'behind-the-scene' video from the film titled 'Larger Than Life', wherein they revealed that the royal palace of Pritampur in the film is 'one of the biggest sets ever made' which was spread around 100,000 sq. feet. Each actor from the film is also heard speaking about the lavish scale of the film with each shot being 'grand'. Production Designer Nitin Chandrakant Desai said that "An attempt to give life to each element has been made.

== Release ==
Prem Ratan Dhan Payo was released worldwide on 12 November 2015, coinciding with Diwali season, in Hindi alongside Tamil and Telugu dubbed version with the Tamil version titled as Meimarandhen Paaraayo (transl. See, I've lost myself) and Telugu version titled as Prema Leela (transl. Love games).

== Critical reception ==
Taran Adarsh of Bollywood Hungama gave the film 4.5/5 stating that "On the whole, PRDP is the perfect Diwali entertainer for the entire family. The film will win abundant love [prem], while its investors will reap a harvest [dhan], making it a memorable Diwali for all concerned." Srijana Mitra Das of Times of India rated the film with 3.5/5 stars stating that PRDP is Salman Khan's triumph and he " simply blows the top off the theatres with a double role that makes you laugh, gasp, sigh – and cry." She also appreciated the performance of Sonam Kapoor, Deepak Dobriyal, Aashika Bhatia and Swara Bhaskar. Sonia Chopra of Sify gave 3/5 stars rating saying that the film has its faults, but with actor Salman Khan's dual role, the movie is sure to hit the right spots with the family audience. Rajeev Masand of CNN-IBN gave the film a rating of 3/5 stars saying that the director employed the same successful formula he had tried in his previous films, but now "the tropes have gotten rusty, the emotions seldom feel genuine, and the writing is strictly surface level". He concluded that the film's only saving grace is the presence of Salman Khan who is in good form.

Shubhra Gupta of Indian Express gave the film a low rating of 1.5/5 stars, calling it a re-imagining of Ramayan and its million stories, criticizing it as "an out-dated, overblown rehash of the director's previous films", while Rohit Vats of Hindustan Times gave the film only 2/5 stars, calling it "as a film straight out of the '80s" rehashing the director's same formula, but appreciated music director Himesh Reshammiya and lead actor Salman Khan as "quite likeable and his comic timing has gotten better". Anna MM Vetticad of First Post thrashed the film as "half-baked, lifeless, low-IQ film with its juvenile humour and family politics that resembles circumstances in the cheapest saas-bahu soaps now running on Hindi fiction TV." and "lacks even the few qualities that made his earlier ventures bearable". Sukanya Verma of Rediff.com rated the film a 2.5/5 stars stating, "PRDP sticks to its beliefs on sibling affection, family values and coy courtship and takes a lengthy route to assert so. Yet it is not the predictability but the lop-sided sentimentality of the director's narrative that hurts PRDP's intentions the most." She criticized the director for recycling "men versus women sporting contests, midnight kitchen rendezvous and the pristine aura of Prem", but appreciated the performance of Salman Khan even though it never matched his previous Bajrangi Bhaijaan act.

== Box office ==
=== India ===
The gross collections of the film was ₹550 million (US$5.9 million) on the first day, which is highest in India.

The film grossed ₹587 million (US$6.3 million) in Mumbai circuit alone from its first week and earned second-highest first week gross in that circuit after PK.

== Music ==
The soundtrack features 10 songs, composed by Himesh Reshammiya and lyrics were written by Irshad Kamil. While Sanjoy Chowdhury composed the original background score for the film. T-Series acquired the music rights of the film at a cost of ₹170 million (US$1.8 million), which was the biggest music deal for any Bollywood film till that date.

The first song, "Prem Leela" was released as a single on October 7, 2015. The full music album was released on 10 October 2015.

== Awards ==
BIG Star Entertainment Awards
| Year | Category | Nominee | Result |
|---|---|---|---|
| 2015 | Most Entertaining Actor of the Year | Salman Khan | Won |
| 2015 | Most Entertaining Actor – Female in a Romantic role | Sonam Kapoor | Won |
| 2015 | Most Entertaining Film of the Year | Rajshri Production | Won |
| 2015 | Most Entertaining Music | Himesh Reshammiya | Won |
| 2015 | Most Entertaining Song (Prem Ratan Dhan Payo) | Himesh Reshammiya | Nominated |
| 2015 | Most Entertaining Singer (Female) | Palak Mucchal (Prem Ratan Dhan Payo) | Won |
| 2015 | Best Choreography (Prem Ratan Dhan Payo) | Radhika Rao/Vinay Sapru | Nominated |
Stardust Awards
| Year | Category | Nominee | Result |
| 2016 | Best Music Director | Himesh Reshammiya | Nominated |
| 2016 | Best Singer Female | Palak Muchhal (Prem Ratan Dhan Payo) | Won |
Star Guild Awards
| Year | Category | Nominee | Result |
| 2016 | Best Singer Female | Palak Muchhal (Prem Ratan Dhan Payo) | Won |
Filmfare Awards
| Year | Category | Nominee | Result |
| 2016 | Best Singer – Female | Palak Muchhal (Prem Ratan Dhan Payo) | Nominated |
Zee Cine Awards
| Year | Category | Nominee | Result |
| 2016 | Best Song of the Year | Himesh Reshammiya (Prem Ratan Dhan Payo) | Won |

== Game ==
An official game titled Prem Game, based on this film has been released by Hungama Digital, for Android mobile phone users.

== See also ==
- Bollywood 100 Crore Club
- List of highest-grossing Indian films
