= Himanshu Malhotra =

Indian actor (born 1982)

Himanshu Ashok Malhotra
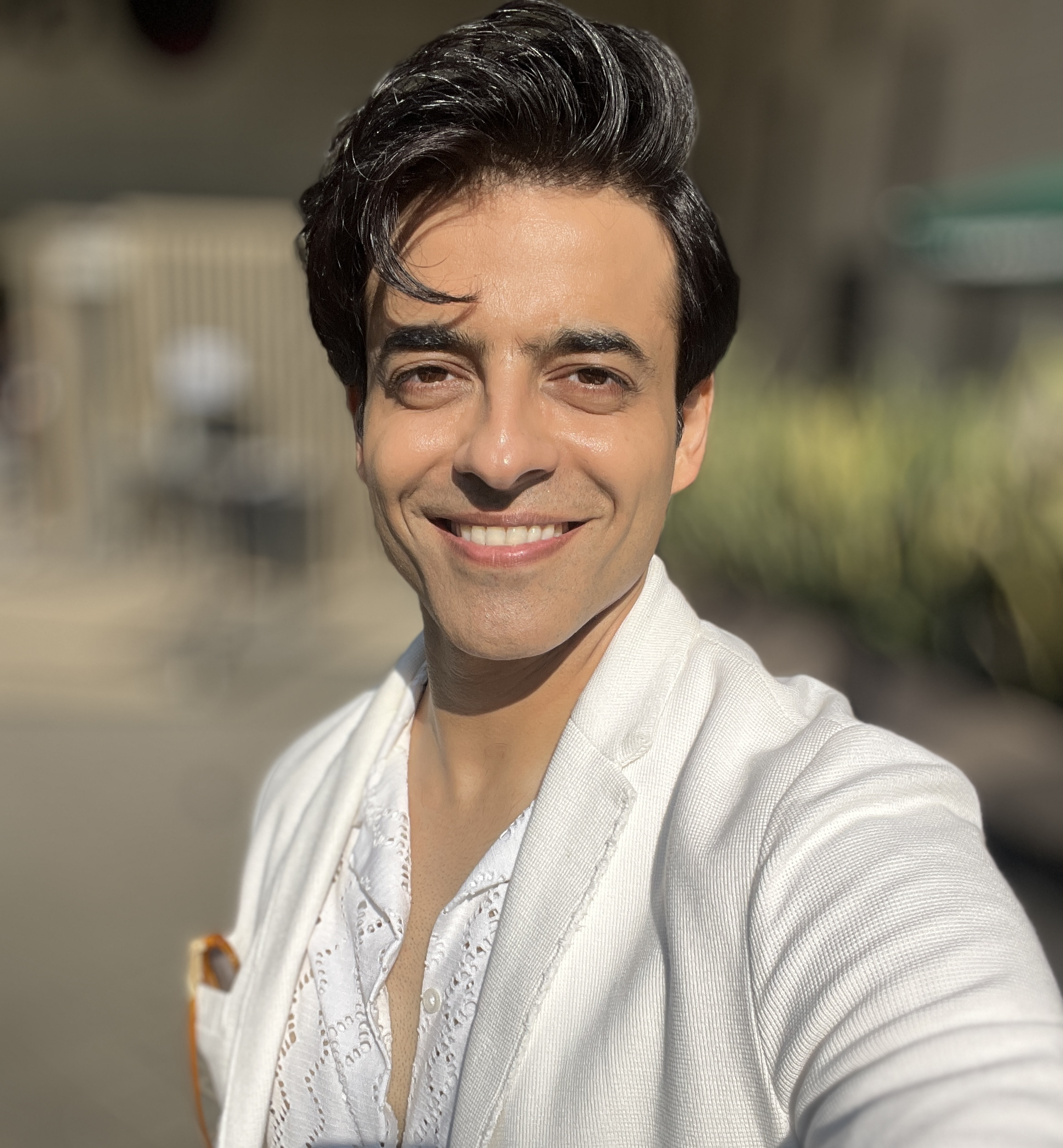
- Himanshu Malhotra in 2025
- Born: 2 April 1982 (age 44); Delhi, India
- Occupation: Actor
- Years active: 2004–present
- Spouse: Amruta Khanvilkar (m. 2015)
- Relatives: Mohit Malhotra (brother)

Himanshu Ashok Malhotra (born 2 April 1982); also credited as Himmanshoo A. Malhotra is an Indian actor who primarily works in Hindi films and television. He is best known for his portrayal in the television series Bhagonwali – Baante Apni Taqdeer, Love Marriage Ya Arranged Marriage and Chikoo Ki Mummy Durr Kei, and the films Shershaah (2021) and Kesari Veer (2025). Malhotra won the dance reality show Nach Baliye 7 and later participated in stunt based reality show Fear Factor: Khatron Ke Khiladi 7.

== Early life ==
Malhotra was born on 2 April 1982 in Delhi to Ashok Malhotra (d. 2013) and Anju Malhotra. He has a younger brother Mohit Malhotra, who is also an actor.

== Career ==
=== Debut and success in television (2004–2015) ===
Himanshu Ashok Malhotra first came to limelight when he was selected to participate in Zee TV's India's Best Cinestars Ki Khoj in 2004, an all India talent hunt in acting and dance where he was amongst the top 6 contestants of the country. The actor is a popular face on Indian television as he has appeared in various shows like Hum Tum, Bindass Champ, Seven by Yashraj films, Shubh Kadam, Aap Ki Antara, Bhagonwali-Baante Apni Taqdeer, and Airlines. He was also seen in Sony's Love Marriage Ya Arranged Marriage as Anoop. Along with his recurring roles, he had special appearances in several shows like Star One's Horror Nights, Sony’s CID, Zee TV's Rab Se Sona Ishq, Yeh Hai Aashiqui on Bindass opposite Shivshakti Sachdev, Encounter on Sony TV and Fear Files on Zee TV. He also essayed an important role in Airlines on Star Plus. In 2015, He participated in Nach Baliye season 7 with his wife Amruta Khanvilkar and won the dance based reality show. He also joined the cast of Ek Nayi Ummeed Roshni as Dr. Sameer Purohit on Life Ok and acted as Milind Joshi in Star Plus’s famous show Chikoo Ki Mummy Durr Kei.

=== Expansion to films and streaming projects (2016–present) ===
Malhotra started 2016 with Khatron Ke Khiladi 7. He then appeared in an episode of Darr Sabko Lagta Hai and played Abu Saleem in Gangster Ki Girlfriend. In the same year, Malhotra made his film debut with Wajah Tum Ho. The film failed at the box office. In 2017, he played Prem in Shankar Jaikishan 3 in 1.

From 2018 to 2019, Malhotra played Lord Vishnu in Paramavatar Shri Krishna and Zain Ashraf in Mariam Khan – Reporting Live opposite Sheena Bajaj. In 2019, he played Aarambh opposite Simran Sharma in the film Hum Chaar. Ramesh S from Rediff.com stated that he "lends decent support" to the film. In 2020, he played a doctor, Dr. Sanjay in Dil Jaise Dhadke... Dhadakne Do.

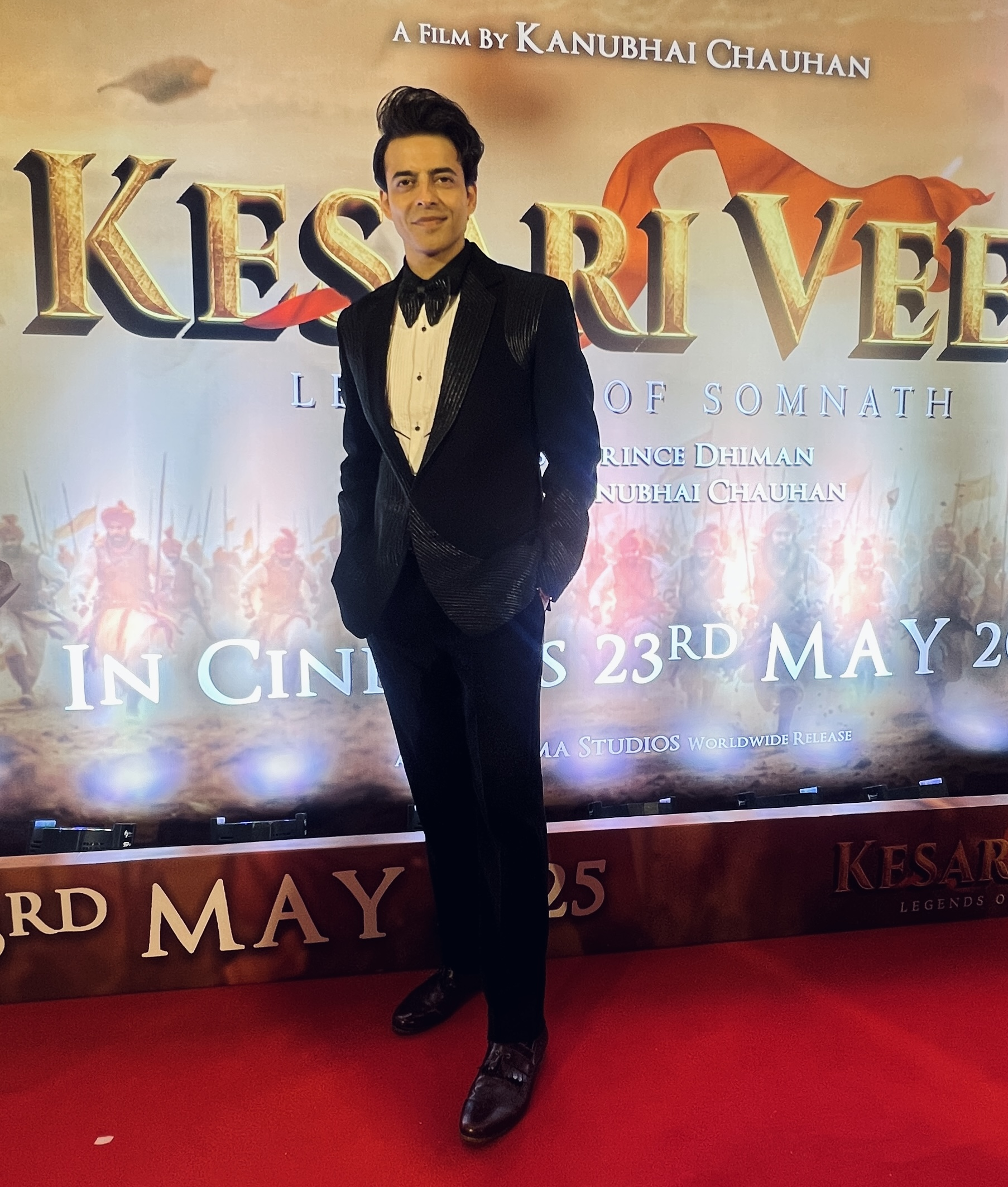
Malhotra at the screening of Kesari Veer (2025).

Malhotra portrayed Captain Rajeev Kapoor in Shershaah alongside Siddharth Malhotra, his first release of 2021. The film emerged as a major digital success and became the most-watched Indian film on Amazon Prime in India at the time of its release. He then played Shiva, Nikki's father in Nikki Aur Jadui Bubble. From 2021 to 2022, Malhotra played Milind Joshi opposite Paridhi Sharma, a couple searching for their lost daughter in Chikoo Ki Mummy Durr Kei. In 2022, he played king Veerapandiya Kattabomman in the series Swaraj.

Malhotra expanded to web series in 2023 with Mauka Ya Dhokha, where he played Amit. In 2025, he first appeared in the series Rana Naidu as Paritosh opposite Kriti Kharbanda. A critic of Bollywood Hungama felt he does "justice" to his role. He then played Rasool, a Tughlaq warrior in Kesari Veer, which underperformed at the box office.

== Personal life ==
Malhotra met actress Amruta Khanvilkar on the sets of India's Best Cinestars Ki Khoj and they eventually began dating. After a decade relationship, Malhotra married Khanvilkar on 24 January 2015, in Delhi. That year, they both won the dancing reality show Nach Baliye season 7. Their relationship has been the subject of media attention in India. On this, Khanvilkar remarked, "I'm traditional in my approach. Himmanshoo and I go way back to a time before Instagram even existed, back in 2004, when we used to take pictures with a camera. We want to safeguard each other's identities and respect that."

== Filmography ==
=== Films ===
Year	Title	Role	Notes	Ref.
2016	Wajah Tum Ho	Karan Parekh		
2019	Hum Chaar	Aarambh		
2021	Shershaah	Captain Rajeev Kapoor		
2023	Doosari Duniya	Nikhil	Short film	
2025	Kesari Veer	Rasool		
2026	The Two Boxes	Vedant	Short film	

=== Television ===
Year	Title	Role	Notes	Ref.
2004	India's Best Cinestars Ki Khoj	Contestant		
2007	Ssshhhh... Phir Koi Hai	Rahil		
2008	Champs	Raj		
2008	Kaisi Laagi Lagan	Swayam		
2009–2010	Aapki Antara	Sameer Malhotra		
2010	Seven	Haryaksh Vashisht		
2010–2012	Bhagonwali – Baante Apni Taqdeer	Guddu Shukla		
2012–2013	Love Marriage Ya Arranged Marriage	Anup Sisodiya		
2013	Rab Se Sohna Isshq	Unknown	Special appearance	
2013	Fear Files	Unknown		
2014	Encounter	Inspector Tilak Nambiyar	Episode: "Ulhas and Urmila's Revenge"	
2014	Yeh Hai Aashiqui	Inspector Mayur	Episode: "Love, Camera, Dhokha"	
2014–2015	Airlines	Rohit Mafatlal		
2014	Box Cricket League	Contestant		
2015	Nach Baliye 7	Contestant	Winner	
2015	Ek Nayi Ummeed Roshni	Dr. Sameer Purohit		
2016	Fear Factor: Khatron Ke Khiladi 7	Contestant	15th place	
2015–2016	Box Cricket League	Contestant	Season 2	
2016	Darr Sabko Lagta Hai	Nirvaan	Episode: "Woh Kaun Thi?"	
2016	Gangster Ki Girlfriend	Abu Saleem		
2017	Shankar Jaikishan 3 in 1	Prem		
2018–2019	Paramavatar Shri Krishna	Vishnu		
2018–2019	Mariam Khan – Reporting Live	Zain Ashraf		
2020	Dil Jaise Dhadke... Dhadakne Do	Dr. Sanjay		
2021	Nikki Aur Jadui Bubble	Shiva		
2021–2022	Chikoo Ki Mummy Durr Kei	Milind Joshi		
2022	Swaraj	Veerapandiya Kattabomman		

=== Web series ===
Year	Title	Role	Notes	Ref.
2023	Mauka Ya Dhokha	Amit		
2025	Rana Naidu	Paritosh	Season 2	
