= Ramyaa =

- Theatrical release poster
- Directed by: Santosh Parab
- Written by: Abhinav Anand Nirala; Santosh Parab; Aarti Saha
- Story by: Sunil Rajan; Santosh Parab
- Produced by: Santosh Parab; Sulbha Kala Kruti; Anandvan Creations
- Starring: Janmmejaya Singh; Samaira Rao; Sayaji Shinde; Ashok Samarth; Sheetal Pathak
- Cinematography: Navin V. Mishra
- Edited by: Amit K. Kaushik
- Music by: Biplaab Dutta
- Production companies: Anandvan Creations; Sulbha KalaKruti Production
- Distributed by: August Entertainment
- Release date: 13 March 2026
- Running time: 110 minutes
- Country: India
- Language: Hindi

Ramyaa is a 2026 Indian Hindi-language crime drama film directed by Santosh Parab. The film is produced by Santosh Parab, Sulbha Kala Kruti and Anandvan Creations. It stars Janmmejaya Singh in the titular role, alongside Samaira Rao, Sayaji Shinde, Ashok Samarth and Sheetal Pathak.

The film explores themes of power, revenge, police and political corruption, human emotions, and an individual's struggle within a gritty, corrupt system. It was released theatrically on 13 March 2026.

== Plot ==
Ramyaa is a compelling drama that follows the journey of a determined young man who finds himself caught between personal responsibilities and the harsh realities of society. Coming from a modest background, Ramyaa believes in honesty, justice, and standing up for what is right. As circumstances push him into difficult situations

== Cast ==
- Janmmejaya Singh as Ramyaa
- Samaira Rao as Vaishali
- Sayaji Shinde as Anna Shetty
- Ashok Samarth as Jaggu Dada
- Sheetal Pathak as Shalini Devi
- Divyannk Patidar as Bhola
- Parthaa Akerkar as Munna
- Ganesh Yadav as Inspector Nagesh
- Pravin Manjarekar as Guruji
- Anant Bhaan as Milind

== Production ==
Ramyaa was produced under the banners of Anandvan Creations and Sulbha Kala Kruti, with Santosh Parab serving as director and one of the producers. The story and concept are credited to Sunil Rajan and Santosh Parab, with screenplay by Abhinav Anand Nirala. Dialogues were written by Santosh Parab, Abhinav Anand Nirala, and Aarti Saha.

Ramyaa is not about glorifying violence or power. It is about understanding the making of a man—how loss, pressure, and decisions define who he becomes. Janmmejaya brings a rare sincerity to the role. From day one, it was clear that this character needed an actor who could speak through silence.

— Santosh Parab

== Music ==
Ramyaa

Soundtrack album by Biplaab Dutta
- Released: 8 March 2026
- Recorded: 2025–2026
- Genre: Feature film soundtrack
- Language: Hindi
- Label: Anandvan Creations & Sulbha Kala Kruti
External audio
- Ramyaa Title Track on YouTube
- Choti Si Bhool on YouTube

The music and background score of the film is composed by Biplaab Dutta.

All lyrics are written by Raghhav Varma.

Track listing
No.	Title	Singers	Length
1.	"Ramyaa (Title Track)"	Roshan Bhat	3:32
2.	"Choti Si Bhool"	Abhijeeta Chauhan, Roshan Bhat	4:03

== Release ==
Ramyaa was released in theatres on 13 March 2026.

== Reception ==
Vinamra Mathur of Firstpost gave it 3.5 out of 5 stars and wrote "This is a film that is making no bones about the action and violence on display with Janmmejaya taking charge. He commands the screen throughout the film. And complementing him equally is veteran actor Sayaji Shinde."

Film Information wrote"Sunil Rajan and Santosh Parab’s concept and story aren’t very exciting because there’s no novelty or freshness. Abhinav Anand Nirala’s screenplay is so routine that the drama becomes one boring saga. Although this is a crime film, the thrill element associated with crime dramas is almost completely missing. The audience, therefore, passively watch the proceedings unfold on the screen but don’t feel involved in it. Dialogues (by Santosh Parab, Abhinav Anand Nirala and Aarti Saha) lack the punch."
