= Love Marriage Ya Arranged Marriage =

- Genre: Drama
- Written by: Anjum Abbas; Surabhi Saral Sachdev; Rekkha Modi
- Directed by: Jignesh Vaishnav
- Creative director: Neelu V. Shroff
- Starring: See below
- Country of origin: India
- Original language: Hindi
- No. of episodes: 92

Production
- Producers: Sunjoy Waddhwa; Comall Sunjoy Waddwa
- Production locations: Udaipur, Rajasthan
- Cinematography: Sanjay Memane; Anil Katke
- Editor: Mukul Das
- Running time: 20 minutes
- Production company: Sphere Origins

Original release
- Network: Sony Entertainment Television
- Release: 6 August 2012 – 10 January 2013

Love Marriage Ya Arranged Marriage (transl. Love Marriage or arranged Marriage) is an Indian soap opera that airs on Sony TV from 6 August 2012 and stars Rishika Mihani and Samaira Rao, Himanshu Malhotra and Ashish Kapoor. The show is set in Udaipur, Rajasthan.

== Plot ==
The story starts with the two friends Shivani and Mansi. Mansi stays with her parents, elder brother (Kunal) and younger sister while Shivani stays with her parents. Shivani has an elder sister, Devyani, who is married to a businessman. Their marriage was arranged but is not a happy one as Devyani's husband does not like her penning up poems. Kunal is married to his heartthrob, Naina.

Shivani runs a shop named "Shagun Shaadi Ka" with the help of dwarfs — Karan and Arjun. The shop sells and caters everything related to weddings. Shivani and Mansi are the best of friends since childhood even after having small quarrels. However, the biggest one was when Devyani leaves her husband and comes to stay with her family in Udaipur from Kankroli. Mansi says that some arranged marriages may not be happy as the couple may have problems. Shivani says that her sister can never ever have a problem and leaves. Shivani plans to leave the city and shift elsewhere to save her from offensive sayings from neighbours and as she has no one left in the city. Shivani leaves a note for Mansi as she is unaware of this. Mansi learns that Shivani has sold her shop and has moved elsewhere and unable to find a note she thinks that she left for her.

The story takes a three-year leap after which Mansi's marriage has been fixed with a kind-hearted and similar kind of man like her: Anup Sisodiya. Anup's younger brother Sahil is in love with a girl and that girl is perhaps Shivani. Mansi and Shivani remain unaware of the fact. However, Shivani tries to meet Mansi again, when she comes to meet Sahil in Udaipur but in vain. Anup and Mansi's marriage happens whereas Sahil and Shivani have a registered marriage. Shivani and Mansi become aware of the fact that they are daughters-in-law of the same house. Sahil's mother Rajlaxmi doesn't accept Sahil's marriage, so Sahil marries Shivani again, in front of his family. Shivani and Mansi solve every problem in their marriage. Sahil's mother also accepts Shivani and after coming to know about her pregnancy. Shivani and Mansi fix their mother-in-law's and Anup's relationship. Anup and mansi develop feelings for each other but they are unaware of each other's feelings. Anup's mother plans to send them on a honeymoon, but they have to cancel the idea because of business issues. Mansi starts to think that Anup still has feelings for his ex-girlfriend. Mansi eventually leaves Anup and goes back to her house. Eventually, this misunderstanding is cleared and both Mansi and Anup confess their feelings for each other. The show ends on a happy note.

== Cast ==
- Samaira Rao as Mansi Anup Sisodiya
- Rishika Mihani as Shivani Sahil Sisodiya
- Himmanshoo A. Malhotra as Anup Sisodiya
- Ashish Kapoor as Sahil Sisodiya
- Shafaq Naaz as Pooja
- Raju Kher as Anand Prakash
- Deepika Upadhyay as Devyani Prakash
- Jyoti Gauba as Mansi's mother
- Vaishnavi Rao as Kavita Ghelot
- Puneet Tejwani as Kunal Ghelot
- Shresth Kumar as Vivan
- Neha Kaul as Naina Ghelot
- Dharti Bhatt as Netra Sisodiya
- Geeta Tyagi as Buaji
- Riddhima Tiwari as Sandhya
- as Rajlaxmi Sisodiya
- Zuber K. Khan as Darien
