= Bommukutty Ammavukku =

Indian Tamil-language soap opera

- Genre: Soap opera
- Directed by: Praveen Benatt
- Starring: Rethva; Rashmitha; Kiran; Sridevi Ashok
- Country of origin: India
- Original language: Tamil
- No. of episodes: 156

Production
- Running time: 22 minutes

Original release
- Network: Star Vijay
- Release: 3 February – 5 December 2020

Related
- Maa....Tomay Chara Ghum Ashena

Bommukutty Ammavukku (transl.For Bommukutty) is a Tamil-language drama that aired on Star Vijay. It began on 3 February 2020 and ended on 5 December 2020 with 156 episodes. It is a remake of the Bengali language series Maa....Tomay Chara Ghum Ashena, which aired on Star Jalsha. The show stars Rethva, Rashmitha and Kiran.

== Plot ==
It is the story of a mother, Meera and her daughter, Aarthi. When young, Aarthi gets kidnapped which leads to Meera getting separated from her. For years, Aarthi is raised as "Bommi" by a female-kidnapper. Circumstances soon lead to Bommi and Meera once again meeting after several years. From then, the story is completely based on how Bommi once again accepts Meera in her life.

== Cast ==
=== Main ===
- Rethva Isvar as Aarthi "Bommi" Prakash
- Roja Rashmita as Meera Prakash
- Kiran Konda as Prakash Laxman
- Sridevi Ashok as Rathna

=== Recurring ===
- Shabnam as Anu
- Surendar KPY as Srini
- Shruthi Shanmugapriya as Prabha Deva
- Padmini Chandrasekaran as Pratima Laxman
- Raj kumar Manohaaran as Deva
- Praveen Nandagopal as Gowtham
- Neepa as Veni
- N.P Aadiv as Aadhi
- Vaishali Thaniga as Swapna

== Adaptations ==
Language	Title	Original release	Network(s)	Last aired	Notes
Bengali	Maa....Tomay Chara Ghum Ashena মা....তোমায় চারা ঘুম আশেনা	19 October 2009	Star Jalsha	3 August 2014	Original
Hindi	Meri Maa मेरी माँ	18 December 2011	Life OK	22 April 2012	Remake
Malayalam	Amma അമ്മ	2 January 2012	Asianet	4 July 2015	Remake
Tamil	Bommukutty Ammavukku பொம்முக்குட்டி அம்மாவுக்கு	3 February 2020	Star Vijay	5 December 2020	Remake
Telugu	Paape Maa Jeevanajyothi పాపే మా జీవనజ్యోతి	26 April 2021	Star Maa	Ongoing	Remake
Hindi	Chikoo - Yeh Ishq Nachaye चिकू - ये इश्क नचाए	6 September 2021	StarPlus	19 March 2022	Remake
