= Paape Maa Jeevanajyothi =

Indian Telugu television series

- Genre: Drama
- Based on: Maa....Tomay Chara Ghum Ashena
- Written by: Dialogues: Jajula Nookarajunaidu
- Screenplay by: K Usharani
- Directed by: V Madhav; Vasavi Kanth; Venkat
- Starring: Pallavi Ramishetty; Priyatham; Baby Sahasra And after generation jump Hemashree; Sidharth R Swamy Diya Siby; Yamini
- Country of origin: India
- Original language: Telugu
- No. of seasons: 1
- No. of episodes: 1401+

Production
- Producers: S Bharathi; S Bharathi Krishna
- Cinematography: K Ramana Mohan
- Editor: Sandeep B
- Camera setup: Multi-camera
- Production company: Sandalwood Media

Original release
- Network: Star Maa
- Release: 26 April 2021 – present

Paape Maa Jeevanjyothi is an Indian Telugu language drama series airing on Star Maa from Monday to Saturday at 12:00 PM from 26 April 2021. It stars Pallavi Ramishetty, Priyatham and Baby Sahasra in lead roles. After the generation jump it is led by Hemashree and Sidharth R Swamy. It is also available on digital streaming platform Disney+ Hotstar. The main plot of the series was taken from popular Bengali language television series Maa....Tomay Chara Ghum Ashena, which aired on Star Jalsha from 19 October 2009 to 3 August 2014 Monday to Saturday and ended on 30 May 2026, after which it was replaced by the serial Malli Nindu Jabili.

== Synopsis ==
It is the story of a mother, Jyothi (Pallavi Ramishetty) and her daughter, Jeevana (Baby Sahasra). At the age of 2 years Jeevana was kidnapped by Karpagam (Mahathi) and handed over to Mallika. Mallika (Bhavana Samanthula) raises Jeevana and names her Kutti. After some series of consequences, Mallika dies due to cancer and reveals truth to Kutti about her mother. Kutti decided to reveal truth to Surya (Priyatham) and Jyothi but failed because of Shambu's evil actions. Meanwhile, she made friendship with orphan girl Malli. Kutti hides the truth and introduces Malli as Jyothi and Surya's biological daughter Jeevana. And Mallika is revealed to be Shambu Prasad's illegitimate daughter.

== Cast ==
=== Main ===
- Pallavi Ramisetty / Jyothi / Unknown as Jyothi – Raghavaiah's daughter; Surya's wife; Kutti and Sreethan's mother; Malli's foster mother; Aditya's mother-in-law.
- Priyatham as Surya Prasad – Gowri and Hymavathi's second son; Vishwa's brother; Jyothi's husband; Kutti and Sreethan's father; Malli's foster father; Aditya's father-in-law..
- Sidharth R Swamy as Suraj
- Hemashree as Jeevana aka Kutti / Anandi – Jyothi and Surya's daughter; Simhadri and Padma's foster daughter; Sreethan's sister; Aditya's wife.
  - Sahasra Darpalli as Child Jeevana aka Kutti
  - Maira as Baby Jeevana aka Kutti

=== Recurring ===
- Preeti Nigam as Hymavathi – Gowri Prasad's wife; Surya and Vishwa's mother; Harsha, Kutti and Sreethan's grandmother
- JL Srinivas as Gowri Prasad – Shambu's brother; Hymavathi's husband; Surya and Vishwa's father; Harsha, Kutti and Sreethan's grandfather
- Mahathi as Karpagam aka Kannamma – Shambu's partner; Jeevana's kidnapper
- Lakshmi Raj as Shambu Prasad – Gowri's brother; Indhu's husband; Vamshi and malli's father; Chaitanya's father-in-law (Dead)
- Diya Siby as Yamini Prasad – Gowri and Hymavathi's first daughter-in-law; Harsha's mother
- Bhavana Reddy as Indhumathi aka Indhu – Shambu's wife; Vamsi's mother;Malli's step-mother; Chaitanya's step-mother-in-law
- Bhavana Samanthula as Mallika – Kutti's foster mother in childhood (Dead)
- Hritesh Avasty as Gowri and Hymavathi's eldest son; Surya and Vishwa's brother; Yamini's husband; Harsha's father
- Kushal Naidu as Vishwa Prasad – Gowri and Hymavathi's youngest son; Surya's brother; Priya's husband
- Shilpa Reddy as Priya – Vishwa's wife
- Darshini Delta as Malli – Fake Jeevana; Shambu's daughter; Indu's step-daughter; Vamshi's step-sister; Jyothi and Surya's foster daughter; Sreethan's foster sister; Chaitanya's wife
  - Aaradya as Child Malli
- Sreetan as Sreethan Prasad – Jyothi and Surya's son; Jeevana's brother; Malli's foster brother
- Ganesh Reddy as Harsha Prasad – Yamini's son
  - Abhiram as Child Harsha Prasad
- Tanav as Vamshi Prasad – Shambu and Indu's son; Malli's step-brother
- Geya Kiran Thangella as Seenu - Jeevana aka kutti's friend
- Meka Ramakrishna as Ragavaiah – Jyothi's father
- Madhu Reddy as Manjari – Kutti's fake mother
- Ajay as Priya's father
- Ayesha as Tulasamma – Gowri Prasad's maid
- Vikram as Karapgam's henchman
- Jabardasth Ashok as Constable
- Jabardasth Ganesh as Constable
- Nandini as Priya's mother
- Unknown as Diwakar
- Sumith as Nishanth

=== Cameo appearances ===
- Mukesh Gowda as Rishi (reprised his role from Guppedantha Manasu)
- Raksha Gowda as Vasu (reprised her role from Guppedantha Manasu)
- Arjun Ambati as Aditya (reprised his role from Devatha - Anubandhala Alayam)

== Adaptations ==
Language	Title	Original release	Network(s)	Last aired	Notes
Bengali	Maa....Tomay Chara Ghum Ashena মা....তোমায় চারা ঘুম আশেনা	19 October 2009	Star Jalsha	3 August 2014	Original
Hindi	Meri Maa मेरी माँ	18 December 2011	Life OK	22 April 2012	Remake
Malayalam	Amma അമ്മ	2 January 2012	Asianet	4 July 2015	Remake
Tamil	Bommukutty Ammavukku பொம்முக்குட்டி அம்மாவுக்கு	3 February 2020	Star Vijay	5 December 2020	Remake
Hindi	Chikoo - Yeh Ishq Nachaye चिकू - ये इश्क नचाए	6 September 2021	StarPlus	19 March 2022	Remake
