= Nikki Aur Jadui Bubble =

Indian Children's Fantasy Adventure Television series

- Genre: Fantasy; Adventure
- Screenplay by: Tarun Chopra; Laxmi Jaikumar
- Story by: Laxmi Jaikumar; Shilpa Rathi (dialogue)
- Directed by: Pawan Parkhi
- Starring: Maisha Dixit; Tanmay Rishi Shah; Himanshu Malhotra; Lavina Tandon
- Theme music composer: Sarthak Nakul
- Opening theme: Nikki Aur Jadui Bubble Ki Kahani Ye
- Country of origin: India
- Original language: Hindi
- No. of episodes: 18

Production
- Producers: Dheeraj Kumar; Zuby Kochar; Sunil Gupta
- Production location: Mumbai
- Editors: Dharmesh Patel; Pradeep Singh
- Running time: 21 minutes
- Production company: Creative Eye Ltd.

Original release
- Network: Dangal TV
- Release: 20 April – 13 May 2021

Nikki Aur Jadui Bubble (transl. Nikki and the Magical Bubble) is a children's fantasy adventure television series that was aired on Dangal TV. It stars Maisha Dixit, Tanmay Rishi, Himanshu Malhotra and Lavina Tandon. This show had to be discontinued in 3 weeks for the safety of the children due to the rapidly growing COVID-19 in India.

== Plot ==
The story starts from Lucknow. While the children keep talking about magic then Shiva comes and tells about the magic and the children leave. Then the clock tells Alaram that today is the birthday of Shiva's daughter, but Shiva is late to go home. He makes a gift with his magic and gives it to Nikki. Nikki is very angry with her father. But he makes Nikki happy with his magic. Nikki insists that she also be taken to the magical world. But in the magical world, only the magician could go. He takes Nikki in an invisible form to the magical world.

That day there is a fight between Shiva and Jhanjarika for the great protector of the world. Jhanjharika is an evil demon and she has not lost any match. The battle begins in which Shiva wins. Acharya takes him to the magical corner. And gives Shiva's magic bubble but all this jhanjharika sees from above invisible but his voice cannot reach him. She wants to have him in any condition.

Shiva comes home and closes his house with a protective shield. Because of this Jhanjharika is not able to enter the house. She fraudulently brings Shiva out of the house and kills him and his wife Lavanya and destroys Shiva's house. Nikki escapes. Before killing him, Shiva even gives this magical bubble to Nikki's bag. Nikki did not know that her mother, father were killed. Nikki moves away from her parents for some reason. And started living in a children's ashram. There are a lot of wicked kids there, they annoy Nikki a lot. Nikki finds the magic bubble and the magic bubble saves more evil kids from the evil sorceress named Jhanjharika.

== Cast ==
- Maisha Dixit as Nikki: Shiva and Lavanya's daughter, Bubble's friend
- Tanmay Rishi Shah as Bubble – A Magical Boy and Nikki's Friend
- Lavina Tandon as Jhanjarika – Evil Magician and Shiva and Lavanya's Killer
- Himanshu Malhotra as Shiva – Nikki's father (Dead)
- Gulfam Khan as Ashram's Strict Warden
- Sheetal as Lavanya – Nikki's Mother (Dead)

== See also ==
- List of programmes broadcast by Dangal TV
