= Kudki =

- Village
- Location in Rajasthan, India Kudki (India)
- Coordinates: 26.45°N 74.25°E
- Country: India
- State: Rajasthan
- District: Beawar

Government
  - Body: Gram panchayat

Population (2001)
  - Total: 3,927

Languages
  - Official: Hindi, Rajasthani
- Time zone: UTC+5:30 (IST)
- PIN: 306101
- Telephone code: 02939
- ISO 3166 code: RJ-IN
- Vehicle registration: RJ-22
- Sex ratio: 981 ♂/♀

Kudki, Kurki or Kudaki is a small village, near Beawar City in Jaitaran tehsil of Beawar district in Indian state of Rajasthan. This village is located in north of Pali district near Nagaur district border. This village is birthplace of Mira Bai, whose father Rao Ratan Singh Rathore was the ruler of Kurki.

== Demographics ==
Kudki village population is 3,927 according to census 2001, where male population is 1,982 while female population is 1,945.
