= Bhai Banno =

Historical religious figure

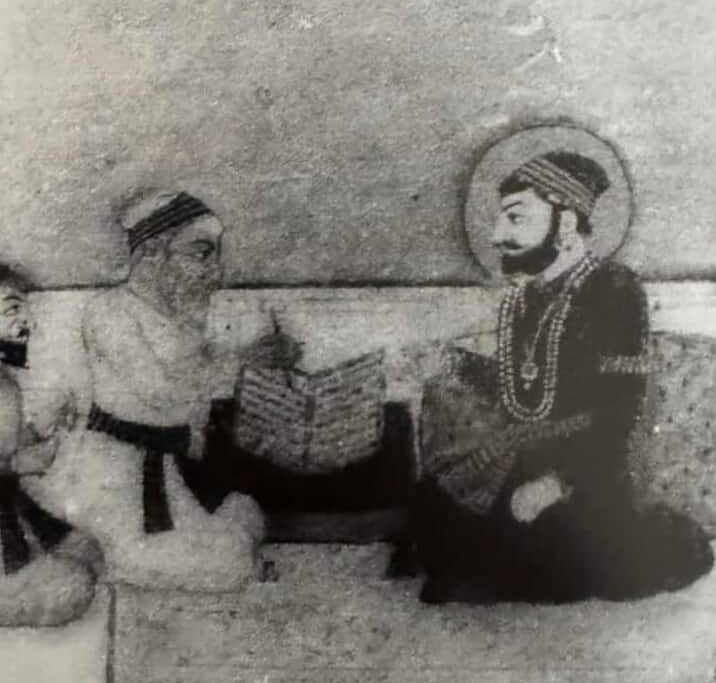
Painting of Bhai Banno and Guru Arjan together, with a volume before them

Bhai Banno (30 April 1558 – January 1645) was a Sikh figure who is remembered for being a devoted follower of the fifth Sikh guru, Guru Arjan. (Note: Bhai Banno's name is alternatively spelt as Bhanno, Bannu, or Bhannu.) He was also a contemporary of Guru Hargobind. He is remembered for preparing a copy and possible variant recension of the Ād Granth.

== Early life and association with Sikhism ==
Banno was born on 30 April 1558 and lived in Mangat village (originally called Khara, later Khara-Mangat) in the Gujrat District of Punjab. He was the son of Bishan Chand Bhatia. Said to have a religious inclination, he became a Sikh and helped with the construction of the Golden Temple in Amritsar. He visited Guru Arjan and was interested in the Ād Granth, whose original manuscript had been recently compiled by Guru Arjan.

== Creation of a copy of the Ād Granth ==
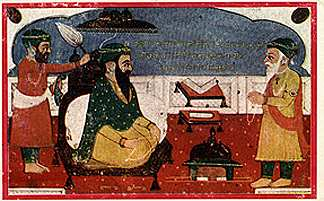
Painting depicting Bhai Banno being given the original Ād Granth volume by Guru Arjan to get it bound, circa 18th century

According to Sikh lore, Banno asked the guru if he could take the manuscript to his village on loan, a request that the guru granted hesitantly as long as Banno only spent one-night in his village with the volume. Banno found a way to adhere to this condition but still have enough time to produce a copy by only travelling a small distance each day on his way to his village and back, which gave him enough time to produce an exact copy of the manuscript, which would come to be known as the Banno Bir. However, there is an alternative story that explains how Bhai Banno created a copy of the manuscript. According to this version, Bhai Banno was tasked with taking the original Ād Granth manuscript to Lahore to be bound and managed to produce his own copy of it while carrying out this task. Another narration claims that Bhanno, enroute to Lahore, first took the volume to his village to prepare a copy, then went to Lahore to get the original volume and the copy both bound, returning both to the guru afterwards, who permitted Bhanno to retain possession of the copy while the guru kept the original. Banno's copy came to be known as the Bhāī Banno Vālī Bīṛ or Khāre Vālī Bīṛ, as it was installed at his residence in his native village Khara-Mangat.

=== Bhai Banno recension ===
A recension of the Guru Granth Sahib, known as the Bhai Banno Bir (also known as the Bhai Bhannowali Bir), was in circulation during the historical period. The composition of this recension is traced back to 1604 and attributed by Bhai Banno, a prominent follower of the Guru, who prepared an unauthorized copy of the composition of Guru Arjan when the Guru asked him to get the leaves bound together into a manuscript at Lahore. Another view is that it was prepared in 1642 by a certain Banno of Khara Mangat (located in modern-day Gujrat district). This composition contains many extraneous, superfluous, and apocryphal writings, including sectarian Mina compositions and compositions of the female Bhakti saint, Mirabai. Guru Gobind Singh would later publish the Damdami recension (also spelled as 'Damdama') of the Adi Granth with Bhai Mani Singh acting as the scribe. The reason for him doing so has been said to be the unauthorized recensions of the Adi Granth scattered throughout the community, especially the Banno recension, which contained unauthorized additions.

Bhai Banno is said to have made an exact copy of the original manuscript of the Ād Granth that had been compiled by Guru Arjan. However, Banno's copy (known as the Khari bir) contained extra works authored by Mirabai, Surdas, and Guru Arjan appended at the end, along with the work Hakikat rah mukam raje shivanabh ki, which were not found or included in the canonical edition finalized by Guru Arjan in 1604. Much of the early Sikh manuscripts of the Guru Granth Sahib that still survive are of the Banno recension, such as those kept at the India Office Library and British Museum. There is a debate regarding whether the Kartarpur Bir or Banno Bir is closer to the original Ād Granth manuscript. (Note: Another controversy has been the discovery of two blank folios in the Kartarpur manuscript (near page 703) and why the Ramakali hymn on that page is just two opening lines. In contrast to the Kartarpur manuscript, the Banno manuscript of Adi Granth, discovered in Kanpur and dated to 1644, is identical in all respects but it has no blank pages and on the folio pages near 703 is a complete hymn. The Banno bir has been controversial because it includes many Hindu rites-of-passage (sanskara) in that version of the Adi Granth. According to W.H. McLeod, the difference in the two versions can be because of three possibilities, from which he withholds judgment: first, Guru Arjan deliberately left the blank folio pages to complete it later, but was unable to because he was arrested and executed by the Mughal emperor Jehangir; second, the hymn and pages existed in the original manuscript, the Banno bir is older, the pages were removed by Khalsa Sikhs from the Kartarpur manuscript and replaced with blank folios in their attempt to carve out a separate Sikh identity from the Hindus during the Singh Sabha Movement; third, the blank pages were intentionally left by Guru Arjan for unknown reasons, and the complete hymn in the Banno bir is an interpolation added by a Sikh follower who wanted to insert Brahminical rites-of-passage rituals in the text. According to G.B. Singh – a Sikh scholar who pioneered study of the early Sikh manuscripts, the evidence supports the second theory. According to Pashaura Singh, his examination of the manuscripts and linguistic evidence yields support for the third theory, noting that the smaller hand and different writing implement in which the remaining 22 lines were written, the lines themselves do not match earlier manuscripts and differ in structure and lexicon from the rest of Guru Arjan's writings, the presence of other short verses in all manuscripts like Vār Basant with only three stanzas, and points to the fact that G.B. Singh had made the claim without actually examining the text, positing that he seemed to have been serving the interests of the Arya Samaj based on his writings.)

== Death and legacy ==
Bhai Banno later conducted missionary work in northwestern Punjab, dying in January 1645. A namesake gurdwara in Bhai Banno's memory is located in Mangat, Mandi Bahauddin, Punjab, Pakistan. The gurdwara was constructed by Maharaja Ranjit Singh. Havelis for Banno's descendants were also constructed in the settlement. Furthermore, a jagir was bestowed upon the family.
