= Samaira Rao =

Indian actress

- Occupation: Actress
- Years active: 2012–present

Samaira Rao is an Indian actress. She played roles in the shows Love Marriage Ya Arranged Marriage and Savitri and she played the role of an agent in the serial Trideviyaan on SAB TV. She is also known for her appearance in the Salman Khan film Prem Ratan Dhan Payo in which she played the role of a personal assistant. She had earlier made her debut in Bollywood with the movie Isi Life Mein.

Samaira was born and brought up in Mumbai. She started her career in modeling with few TV advertisements. She did few small roles on TV, but her main role came in the serial Love Marriage Ya Arranged Marriage on Sony TV. After being noticed as the main lead in this serial, Samaira was cast in other serials as main leads.

== Television ==
No.	TV Serial Name	Role
1	Love Marriage Ya Arranged Marriage	Mansi Anup Sisodiya
2	Savitri	Cameo (as Herself)
3	Trideviyaan	Tanuja "Tanu" Garv Chauhan/Agent Hawa Mahal/Bijli (Duplicate)

== Films ==
Year	Title	Role	Notes
2010	Isi Life Mein	Valerie	
2015	Prem Ratan Dhan Payo	Sameera	
2026	Ramyaa	Vaishali	
