= Shalini Sahuta =

Indian model and actress

Shalini S Sahuta
- Born: 26 July 1992 (age 33)
- Occupations: Model, Actress
- Years active: 2007—present

Shalini S Sahuta (born 26 July 1992) is an Indian model and actress who is best known for her role as Manu in the show "Trideviyaan" on SAB TV for which she was nominated for the best actress in the ITA and GOLD AWARDS.

Shalini S Sahuta started her career at the age of 14 with numerous print ads and commercials for HDFC, ICICI, MAGGIE, AD GEL PENS etc. She also starred in Jagjit Singh's Musical video "Inteha". She was also a radio jockey with BIG92.7FM and is also a voice over and dubbing artiste. She debuted in television as the lead of "GupShup Coffee Shop" on SAB TV.

She is from Mumbai and holds a degree in information technology. She is also an entrepreneur who owns a salon "ALOHAA" in Bandra West, Mumbai.

== Filmography ==
Television

Year	Series	Role	Channel
2007	GupShup Coffee Shop	Sanju	SAB TV
2008-2009	Naaginn	Mohini	Zee TV
2010	Lowest Price Shop	Host	Zoom TV
2011	Ganga Ki Dheej	Anjali	Sahara One
2012	Baba Aiso Varr Dhoondo	Pari	Imagine TV
2013	Piya Ka Ghar Pyaara Lage	roop	Sahara One
2014	Pyaar Ka The End	Damini	Bindaas
2014	Sasural Simar Ka	Sonia Khushi / Simar (double Triple role) bobby friend Khushi Mask	Colors TV
2014	Date Knight	Anchor	NDTV Good Times
2014	Har Mushkil Ka Hal Akbar Birbal	Vish Kanya/ Sukanya	Big Magic
2015	Uff Yeh Nadaniyaan	Poo	Big Magic
2015	Total Nadaniyaan	Jassi/ Jasmeet	Big Magic
2015	Dafa 420	Priyanka	Life OK
2015-2016	Nautanki News	Anarkali	Big Magic
2017	Trideviyaan	Manu/ Manya Chauhan / Agent Qutub Minar	SAB TV

Films

Year	Movie	Role
2011	Ready	Naina/Maid
