= Anshul Trivedi =

Indian actor

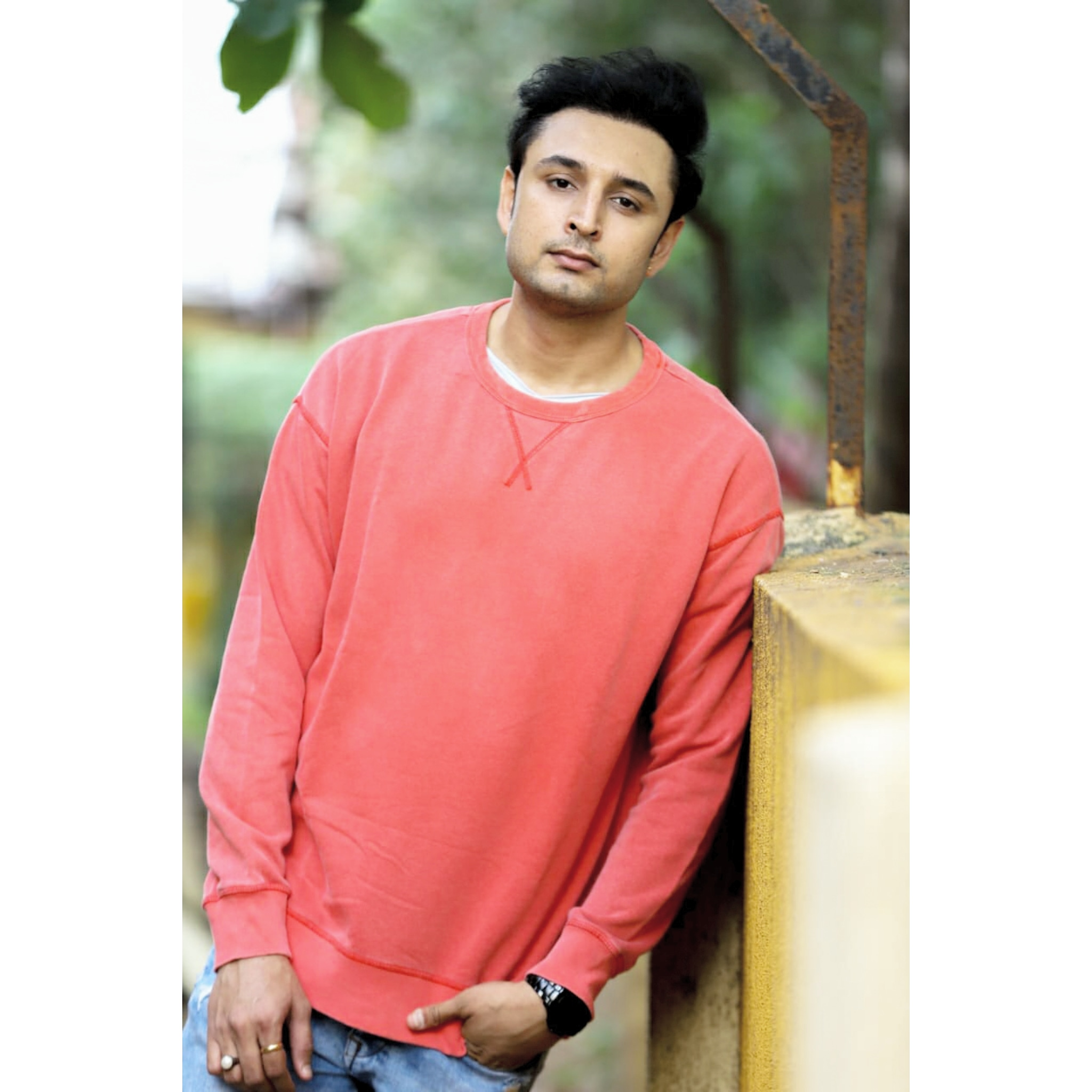
- Anshul Trivedi
- Born: Vadodara, Gujarat, India
- Occupation: Actor
- Years active: 2012 to present
- Known for: Goliyon Ki Raasleela Ram-Leela, Saraswatichandra, Trideviyaan, Oxygen

Anshul Trivedi is an Indian actor known for his works in Hindi cinema and Indian television. He appeared as a lead in Balika vadhu 2 , Trideviyaan, Khidki, Saraswatichandra, Ishq Ka Rang Safed, Ek Rishta Aisa Bhi, Kaali - Ek Punar Avataar, Raam Leela and Ramayai Vastavaiya. He did a short story "Love by Chance" for UTV Bindass, Bisaat Rishton Ki and Main Lakshmi Tere Aangan Ki He was also seen as "Tantiya Tope" in the show " Jhansi Ki Rani" on colours in 2019.

== Early life ==
Anshul Trivedi is a Gujarati. He grew up in his hometown Vadodara, Gujarat, and also spent five years in Atul, Valsad

== Career ==
He did bachelors in Business Administration (B.B.A) from Maharaja Sayajirao University of Baroda and Post graduation in Public Relations & Corporate Communications (P.R.C.C) from Xavier's Institute of Communications (XIC) from St. Xavier's College, Mumbai. He is professionally trained in Hindustani Shastriya Sangeet (Indian classical) for 7 years. He was the winner of Sugama Sangeetha (Light Vocal) competition in the year 2004 at National Youth Festival (India). He has also won state-level swimming competitions for 3 consecutive years and represented the Indian state of Gujarat at National level swimming championship organised by Ministry of Youth Affairs and Sports. While he was graduating, music maestro Viju Shah heard him singing at one of the competitions and offered him to come down to Mumbai and perform with him in Navratri Shows and other shows. This was the beginning of his music career. He worked with Viju Shah for more than 5 years and did many live performances. After his post graduation in PR and Corporate Communications, he got placed at CMCG India – a PR firm founded in Mumbai. Before the completion of probation period, he quite his first job and started pursuing his dream of becoming an actor. Anshul has worked with film directors and producers such as Sanjay Leela Bhansali, Prabhu Deva, Umesh Shukla, and Vikram Bhatt

== Filmography ==
=== Films ===
Year	Film	Role	Language	Notes
2013	Ramaiya Vastavaiya	Anshul	Hindi	
2013	Goliyon Ki Raasleela Ram-Leela	Mandar	Hindi	
2017	Pela Adhi Akshar	Sunil	Gujarati	
2018	Oxygen	Shakespeare Joshi	Gujarati	
2022	Kesariya	Agam Somani	Gujarati	Filming

=== Web series ===
Year	Title	Role	Platform	Notes
2022	Guilty Minds	PSA Shah	Amazon Prime	

=== Television ===
Year	Title	Role
2011	Sasural Genda Phool	Sanjana friend
2011-2012	Main Lakshmi Tere Aangan Ki	Vishal Chaturvedi
2012	Kaali – Ek Punar Avatar	Nimai Rajhans
2013	Saraswatichandra	Pramadan "Pramad" Dharmadhikari
2014	Sasural Simar Ka	Baba
2014-2015	Ek Rishta Aisa Bhi	Abhimaan Roy
2015	Love by Chance	Shaama Bhai
2016	Ishq Ka Rang Safed	Parshya
2016	Khidki	Rahul
2016	Adaalat	Viren Kumar
2016-2017	Trideviyaan	Inspector Shaurya Chauhan
2018	Kaun Hai?	
2019	Khoob Ladi Mardaani... Jhansi Ki Rani	Tatya Tope
2021	Balika Vadhu 2	Khimji Bhujaariya
2023-2025	Pushpa Impossible	Jugal Setalwad
