= Meri Maa (Indian TV series) =

- Starring: Ravi Dubey; Sayantani Ghosh; Avneet Kaur; Neena Kulkarni; Parikshit Sahni; Ketaki Kadam; Shivam Jagtap; Gunjan Vijaya( Manisha)
- Theme music composer: Jeet Gannguli, Lyrics by Sanjeev Tiwari
- Opening theme: "Geeli Aankhen Pucche Tu Kahaan" by Shreya Ghoshal
- Country of origin: India
- Original language: Hindi
- No. of seasons: 1
- No. of episodes: 100

Production
- Producer: SVF Entertainment
- Running time: approx. 24
- Production companies: SVF Entertainment

Original release
- Network: Life OK
- Release: 18 December 2011 – 22 April 2012

Related
- Maa....Tomay Chara Ghum Ashena

Meri Maa is an Indian television drama series that aired on Life OK from 18 December 2011 to 22 April 2012.

== Plot ==
Young Jhilmil was abducted at her young age in a festival. She is then raised in a slum with other kids. Jhilmil's real mother mourns for the loss of her daughter but her mother-in-law thinks she is responsible of this abduction and loss.

== Cast ==
- Sayantani Ghosh as Pratibha
- Avneet Kaur as Jhilmil
- Neena Kulkarni
- Jatin Shah
- Parikshit Sahni
- Ketaki Kadam
- Shahab Khan
- Shivam Jagtap as Bhola

== Adaptations ==
Language	Title	Original release	Network(s)	Last aired	Notes
Bengali	Maa....Tomay Chara Ghum Ashena মা....তোমায় চারা ঘুম আশেনা	19 October 2009	Star Jalsha	3 August 2014	Original
Hindi	Meri Maa मेरी माँ	18 December 2011	Life OK	22 April 2012	Remake
Malayalam	Amma അമ്മ	2 January 2012	Asianet	4 July 2015	Remake
Tamil	Bommukutty Ammavukku பொம்முக்குட்டி அம்மாவுக்கு	3 February 2020	Star Vijay	5 December 2020	Remake
Telugu	Paape Maa Jeevanajyothi పాపే మా జీవనజ్యోతి	26 April 2021	Star Maa	Ongoing	Remake
Hindi	Chikoo - Yeh Ishq Nachaye चिकू - ये इश्क नचाए	6 September 2021	StarPlus	19 March 2022	Remake
