= Chikoo Ki Mummy Durr Kei =

Indian television series

- Genre: Youth; Romance; Drama
- Created by: Gul Khan
- Developed by: Sahana
- Written by: Munisha Rajpal
- Screenplay by: Vikas Tejpal Sharma; Aanchal A Vasani
- Story by: Aakriti Atreja; Vera Raina; Faizal Akhter; Pallavi Mehta
- Directed by: Arif Ali Ansari; Neeraj Pande
- Starring: Vaishnavi Prajapati; Simran Tomar; Paridhi Sharma; Himanshu Malhotra; Monika Khanna
- Country of origin: India
- Original language: Hindi
- No. of seasons: 2
- No. of episodes: 168

Production
- Producers: Gul Khan; Karishma Jain; Nilanjana Purkayasstha; Herumb Kot
- Editors: Satya Sharma; Sumant Sharma
- Camera setup: Multi-camera
- Running time: 21 minutes
- Production companies: 4 Lions Films; Invictus T Media

Original release
- Network: StarPlus
- Release: 6 September 2021 – 19 March 2022

Related
- Maa....Tomay Chara Ghum Ashena

Chikoo - Yeh Ishq Nachaye is an Indian Hindi-language soap opera that premiered on 6 September 2021 on StarPlus as Chikoo Ki Mummy Durr Kei. It is also digitally available on Disney+ Hotstar. Produced by 4 Lions Films and Invictus T Media, it initially starred Vaishnavi Prajapati, Paridhi Sharma, Himanshu Malhotra and Monika Khanna. It is a remake of Star Jalsha's Bengali series Maa....Tomay Chara Ghum Ashena.

On 14 February 2022, the serial took a 10-year leap and was rebranded as Chikoo - Yeh Ishq Nachaye starring Simran Tomar. The serial ended on 19 March 2022 due to low TRP.

== Series overview ==
Season	Title	No. of episodes	Originally broadcast (India)	
Season	Title	No. of episodes	First aired	Last aired
1	Chikoo Ki Mummy Durr Kei	138	6 September 2021	12 February 2022
2	Chikoo-Yeh Ishq Nachaye	30	14 February 2022	19 March 2022

== Plot ==
On her 3rd birthday, Payal Joshi gets kidnapped by a woman-kidnapper, Rangoli and is separated from her family including her mother, Nupur Joshi.

=== 7 years later ===
For 7 years, the Joshis believe that Payal is dead, while Nupur is still in hope. Meanwhile, Payal has been raised as Chikoo by Rangoli. She is talented dancer like Nupur and is determined to find her parents. Soon, Payal and Nupur meet and share a bonding. Nupur brings Payal to Joshis who, including Nupur's husband, Milind, reject her .

Kamini finds out that Chikoo is Payal and conspires against her. Milind's disabled father, Shashikant also learns Payal's truth after seeing her pendent, which was gifted by Nupur to Payal. Due to a misunderstanding, Nupur throws Payal out of house. Later, Payal saves the kids from Hira Amma, a female kidnapper and Rangoli reveals that Nupur is her mother, making amends with the children before dying. Payal helps an orphan Mini, who betrays the latter by pretending to Payal. Nupur and Milind decide to adopt Payal while Kamini and Mini conspire against them.

Soon, Mini is exposed and Chikoo reveals that she is Payal. Joshis refuse to believe her and decide to send her away. However, Payal falls off a cliff and loses her memory while Joshis believe she is dead. She is rescued by Sameer Khaitan and begins to live as his late daughter, Archie. Nupur encounters Payal and tries to get her memory back. Eventually, Payal regains her memory while Nupur finds out that Chikoo is indeed her daughter, Payal. Nupur falls off stairs to death while Payal returns to her. Sameer adopts Payal after that.

=== 10 years later ===
Payal is now grown up and returns to Mumbai. She is an internet dancing sensation under the name of "Ishq" and teaches dance by wearing a mask through her social-media handle "Yeh Ishq Nachaye". She crosses-paths with Dhanush. Dhanush develops a soft-corner for her but is pressured by his mother, Alka to be the first in everything, which sometimes pushes him into crossing boundaries. Soon, Dhanush realizes his mistakes and apologizes to Payal and helps her. Mini too apologizes Payal for her past mistakes. It is revealed that Nupur was murdered by Kamini. Sameer, Payal and Mini expose Kamini, who is later arrested. The Joshis finds that Chikoo is Payal and reunite with her. Finally, Payal and Dhanush confess their love and everybody celebrate it.

== Cast ==
=== Main ===
- Simran Tomar as Payal "Chikoo/Ishq" Joshi – Nupur and Milind's daughter; Sameer's adopted daughter; Dhanush’s love interest. (2022)
  - Vaishnavi Prajapati as Child Payal "Chikoo" Joshi / Fake Archie Khaitan (2021–2022)
  - Aria Sakaria as Baby Payal (2021)
- Paridhi Sharma as Nupur Joshi – Naresh and Asha's daughter; Milind's wife; Payal's mother (2021–2022)(Dead)
- Lakshay Khurana as Dhanush Chauhan – Alka's son; Keshav's cousin; Payal's love interest (2022)
- Himanshu Malhotra as Milind Joshi – Savitri and Shashikant's younger son; Subodh's brother; Nupur's husband; Payal's father (2021–2022)(Dead)
- Monica Khanna as Rangoli – Payal's kidnapper (2021) (Dead)
- Ankur Nayyar as Sameer Khaitan – Pushpa's son; Rayna's widower; Archie's father; Chikoo's adoptive father (2022)

=== Recurring ===
- Deepali Pansare as Kamini Joshi – Subodh's wife; Nivan and Aarav's mother. (2021-2022)
- Manav Verma as Subodh Joshi – Savitri and Shashikant's elder son; Milind's brother; Kamini's husband; Nivan and Aarav's father.(2021–2022)
- Sujata Thakkar as Savitri Joshi – Shashikant's wife; Subodh and Milind's mother; Nivan, Aarav and Payal's grandmother. (2021–2022)
- Sunil Shroff as Shashikant Joshi – Rama's brother; Savitri's husband; Subodh and Milind's father; Nivan, Aarav and Payal's grandfather. (2021–2022) (Dead)
- Seema Sharma as Rama Joshi – Shashikant's sister; Deepika's mother; Subodh and Milind's aunt (2021–2022)
- Cheshta Bhagat as Deepika "Deepu" Joshi – Rama's daughter (2022)
- Mohit Duseja as Nivan Joshi – Kamini and Subodh's elder son; Aarav's brother (2022)
  - Vedant Pandya as Child Nivan Joshi (2021–2022)
- Mohit Tiwari as Aarav Joshi – Kamini and Subodh's younger son; Nivan's brother (2022)
  - Kabir Mehta as Child Aarav Joshi (2021–2022)
- Anushka Merchande as Mini Joshi – Joshis' adoptive daughter (2022)
  - Tamanna Deepak as Child Mini / Fake Payal (2021–2022)
- Binda Rawal as Pushpa Khaitan – Sameer's mother; Archie's grandmother; Chikoo's adoptive grandmother (2022)
- Punesh Tripathi as Gajak – Household help at Khaitans (2022)
- Geetu Bawa as Alka Chauhan – Dhanush's mother (2022)
- Raghav Dhir as Keshav Chauhan – Dhanush's cousin (2022)
- Anupama Solanki as Rashi Panjvani – Kamini's best friend. (2021)
- Gauri Sukhtankar as Reema – Nupur's friend and well-wisher. (2021)
- Asmita Sharma as Hira – Female kidnapper (2021–2022)
- Vedant Khot as Sulab – Chikoo's friend. (2021)
- Kartavya Upadhyay as Tanki – Chikoo's friend. (2021–2022)
- Ishlin Prasad as Flower – Chikoo's friend. (2021–2022)
- Honey Bajaj as Signal – Chikoo's friend. (2021)
- Himanshu Mishra as Local – Chikoo's friend. (2021–2022)
- Niranjan Namjoshi as Inspector Ganpat Patil – Rangoli's lover (2021)
- Manan Handa as Apaar – Chikoo's college friend (2022)
- Shivani Thakur as Dimple – Chikoo's college friend (2022)
- Neeti Kaushik as Pooja: Payal's friend

== Production ==
=== Development ===
The show premiered on 6 September 2021 featuring the story of young Chikoo, who is separated from her mother.

In February 2022, the serial took a 10-year-leap, post which actors Paridhi Sharma and Himanshu Malhotra quit. The makers roped in debut actress Simran Tomar to play the grown-up Chikoo in the show. The show went off-air on 19 March 2022 due to low TRP ratings.

=== Release ===
The first promo was released on 28 July 2021, featuring the leads Vaishnavi Prajapati and Paridhi Sharma.

On 24 August 2021, a promo featuring famous veteran actor and dancer Mithun Chakraborty was released by the channel, announcing the launch-date.

== Adaptations ==
Language	Title	Original release	Network(s)	Last aired	Notes
Bengali	Maa....Tomay Chara Ghum Ashena মা....তোমায় চারা ঘুম আশেনা	19 October 2009	Star Jalsha	3 August 2014	Original
Hindi	Meri Maa मेरी माँ	18 December 2011	Life OK	22 April 2012	Remake
Malayalam	Amma അമ്മ	2 January 2012	Asianet	4 July 2015	Remake
Tamil	Bommukutty Ammavukku பொம்முக்குட்டி அம்மாவுக்கு	3 February 2020	Star Vijay	5 December 2020	Remake
Telugu	Paape Maa Jeevanajyothi పాపే మా జీవనజ్యోతి	26 April 2021	Star Maa	Ongoing	Remake
Hindi	Chikoo - Yeh Ishq Nachaye चिकू - ये इश्क नचाए	6 September 2021	StarPlus	19 March 2022	Remake
