= Maa....Tomay Chara Ghum Ashena =

Indian television series

- Genre: Indian Soap Opera
- Created by: Shree Venkatesh Films
- Screenplay by: Sudip; Soumyava
- Story by: Shahana Dutta; Preetikana Paul Roy (dialogues)
- Directed by: Sushanta Das; Debidas Bhattacharyya
- Starring: Tithi Bose; Sritama Bhattacharjee; Mahua Halder
- Voices of: Madhuraa Bhattacharya
- Opening theme: "Tomay Chara Ghum Asena"
- Composer: Jeet Gannguli
- Country of origin: India
- Original language: Bengali
- No. of episodes: 1508

Production
- Producers: Shrikant Mohta; Mahendra Soni
- Production location: Kolkata
- Running time: 21 minutes
- Production company: Shree Venkatesh Films

Original release
- Network: Star Jalsha
- Release: October 19, 2009 – August 3, 2014

Maa...Tomay Chara Ghum Ashena, also called Maa (Bengali: মা...তোমায় ছাড়া ঘুম আসেনা; transl. Mother), is a Bengali television serial broadcast on Star Jalsha. It was produced by Shree Venkatesh Films. The show narrates the bond between mother and daughter. It is one of the longest running Bengali television soap opera and Star Jalsha's longest-ran serial.

== Premise ==
When Pari Mukherjee is three years old, she is kidnapped, leading to Pratima Mukherjee, her mother, being separated from her daughter. For years, Pari is raised as a thief under the name Jhilik by her kidnapper. Eventually, Jhilik and Pratima meet again after many years, but is separated again due to misunderstandings. Jhilik later gets adopted by Pratima Roy Chowdary, a blind billionaire. Thanks to her, they recognise each other later. Retroactive continuity reveals that Pratima Roy Chowdary kidnapped Pari for revenge to Pratima Mukherjee and had replaced Jhilik with Diya Roy Chaterjee, a patient in her hospital.

== Cast ==
=== Main ===
- Tithi Bose as Jhilik/Pari Mukherjee (2013-2014)
  - Tithi Bose as Child Jhilik/Pari (2009-2011)
  - Sohena Roy as Baby Pari
- Sritama Bhattacharjee as Adult Jhilik/Pari Mukherjee (retconned) (2011-2013) and Diya Roy (2013-2014)
- Mahua Halder as Pratima Mukherjee: Pari's mother; Manish's wife
- Anindya Chatterjee as Rajdeep Roy (Raj), Diya's husband
- Aparajita Adhya as Pratima Roy Chowdary

=== Recurring ===
- Bhaswar Chatterjee as Manish Mukherjee, Pari's father
- Chhanda Karanjee Mukherjee as Mamata Mukherjee, Pari's Grandmother
- Chandicharan as Harishankar Mukherjee - Mamata's husband, Pari's Grandfather
- Saswata Chatterjee as Bhaswati's husband
- Anindita Saha Kapileshwari as Bhaswati Chatterjee, Arati's younger sister in law.
- Rita Dutta Chakraborty as Arati Mukherjee, Harishankar's young sister
- Aritra Dutta as Dipu, Pari's uncle and Arati's son
- Rajiv Bose as Arunangshu Mukherjee (Angshu), Jhilik's/Diya's ex-lover and Subhroto's son
- Dolon Roy as Mohini Chatterjee, Diya's step mother
- Sourav Das as Rik Chatterjee
- Ena Saha as Anu, Atish's wife
- Chandraneev Mukherjee as Atish, youngest son of Mukherjee family
- Sujata Daw as Aheli, youngest daughter of Mukherjee family
- Soma Chakraborty as Hira Amma
- Sonali Chowdhury as Rajeswari, Diya's aunt
- Ashmita Chakraborty as Phulki
  - Bhavana Banerjee as Child Phulki
- Aritram Mukherjee as Aditya Roychowdhury, Phulki's husband and Pratima Roy Chowdhury's son
- Rohit Mukherjee as Debesh, Pari's elder uncle
- Ritoja Majumder as Bidisha, Debesh's wife
- Amitava Bhattacharyya as Doctor
- Biswajit Chakraborty as Samaresh Chatterjee, Diya's father
- Shankar Chakraborty as Subhroto, Jhilik's/Pari's Sports teacher and Angshu's father
- Priyanka Bhattacharjee as Babli, Pratima Roy Chowdhury's daughter

== Production ==
The show was produced by Shree Venkatesh Films. For three years it was the highest rated show on Star Jalsha. The serial ended on August 3, 2014. A special episode featured stars of other serials as well as film personalities like Koel Mallick and Raj Chakraborty.

== Adaptations ==
Language	Title	Original release	Network(s)	Last aired	Notes
Bengali	Maa...Tomay Chara Ghum Ashena মা...তোমায় ছাড়া ঘুম আসেনা	19 October 2009	Star Jalsha	3 August 2014	Original
Hindi	Meri Maa मेरी माँ	18 December 2011	Life OK	22 April 2012	Remake
Malayalam	Amma അമ്മ	2 January 2012	Asianet	4 July 2015	Remake
Tamil	Bommukutty Ammavukku பொம்முக்குட்டி அம்மாவுக்கு	3 February 2020	Star Vijay	5 December 2020	Remake
Telugu	Paape Maa Jeevanajyothi పాపే మా జీవనజ్యోతి	26 April 2021	Star Maa	Ongoing	Remake
Hindi	Chikoo - Yeh Ishq Nachaye चिकू - ये इश्क नचाए	6 September 2021	StarPlus	19 March 2022	Remake

== Awards ==
The soap won many awards at the Tele Cine Awards, Star Jalsha awards and the Tele Samman Awards. Some of them are:

- Best Actress – Sritama Bhattacharjee (at the 13th Tele Cine Awards)
- Best Performance – Soma Chakraborty (at the 13th Tele Cine Awards)
