= Trideviyaan =

Indian television series

- official poster of Trideviyaan
- Genre: Thriller; Comedy
- Created by: Amir Jaffar; Sonali Jaffar
- Written by: Sameer Garud; Gauri Kodimala; Rajesh Chawla; Rishabh Sharma
- Directed by: Rahul Mevawala, Dhaval Jitesh Shukal
- Starring: See below
- Country of origin: India
- Original language: Hindi
- No. of seasons: 1
- No. of episodes: 190

Production
- Producers: Amir Jaffar; Sonali Jaffar
- Production locations: Mumbai, India
- Camera setup: Multi-camera
- Production company: Full House Media

Original release
- Network: SAB TV
- Release: 15 November 2016 – 7 August 2017

Trideviyaan is an Indian Hindi Thriller, Comedy television series, which was broadcast on SAB TV. The series was produced by Full House Media of Amir and Sonali Jaffar.

== Plot ==
The plot follows the story of two girls - Dhanushree "Dhannu" and Tanuja "Tannu" who are caring housewives and also, work as secret agents for their father-in-law, Dinanath Chauhan alias Agent Himalaya. Dhannu alias Agent Laal Kila is married to Dinanath's elder son Shaurya Chauhan who is an honest and brave police inspector and Tannu alias Agent Hawa Mahal marries Dinanath's younger son, Garv Chauhan who is a crime news reporter. On their wedding day, when the time comes to leave the maternal home, Tannu locks the door of her room and refuses to leave. When asked, she confesses to Dinanath that she likes Garv but doesn't wish to go to her marital home and sacrifice her profession, which is a secret. But Dinanath reveals that he is aware of her secret, that she is UCA (Under Cover Army)'s secret agent and then he mentions that he is also a UCA agent, Agent Himalaya and henceforth she would continue in her profession by joining his secret army with another agent. Tannu then gladly accepts to leave for her new home and also thinks that the agent who would be joining her is her brother-in-law, Shaurya. On their way, they stop at a temple to complete Dhannu's manner regarding this marriage. But, as they were about to leave the temple after completing the "Mannat", a group of thieves threatens the entire Chauhan family, and they are taken to a distant place. There it is revealed to us that the second agent is Dhannu! The duo then beat up the goons and all the family members manage to escape. But Garv and Tannu are unable to spend time together on their wedding night as Tannu is called to Dinanath's secret lab where she is introduced to many new gadgets. But one day, Dinanath's younger daughter Manya Chauhan a.k.a. Mannu discovers that Tannu, Dhannu, and Dinanath are secret agents and wants to join their team as "Agent Qutub Minar" or else she will tell everyone, especially her mother, the secret.

On a fake mission, which coincidentally turns real, Mannu saves her co-agents and is permitted to receive training and become an agent and then the agents become known as "Trideviyaan". They successfully conceal their secret identities from Dinanath's wife Suhasini Chauhan, his mother Damyanti Chauhan who is a kleptomaniac, Fatteh Mama - the servant, the paying guests, and even from Shaurya and Garv. With Dhannu's strength, Tannu's speed, and Mannu's power of voice, they are a formidable team.

== Cast ==
=== Main ===
- Aishwarya Sakhuja-Nag as Dhanashree Chauhan (aka Dhannu) Agent Laal Kila:
  - Shaurya's wife, Dinanath and Suhasini's elder daughter-in-law, Damyanti's elder granddaughter-in-law; Mannu's elder sister-in-law. (Bhabhi)
- Samaira Rao as Tanuja Chauhan (aka Tannu) Agent Hawa Mahal/ Bijli (duplicate):
  - Garv's wife, Dinanath and Suhasini's younger daughter-in-law, Damyanti's younger granddaughter-in-law; Mannu's younger sister-in-law. (Bhabhi)
- Shalini Sahuta as Manya Chauhan (aka Mannu) Agent Qutub Minar:
  - Dinanath and Suhasini's daughter, Shaurya, and Garv's younger sister, Damyanti's granddaughter; Prem's love interest
- Rituraj Singh as Dinanath Chauhan 'Dad Ji' Agent Himalaya:
  - Damyanti's son; Dhannu and Tannu's father-in-law, Suhasini's husband, Shaurya, Garv and Mannu's father
- Anshul Trivedi as Shaurya Chauhan:
  - A police officer, Dhannu's husband, Dinanath and Suhasini's elder son; Damyanti's grandson;Garv and Mannu's elder brother
- Winy Tripathi as Garv Chauhan:
  - A crime reporter, Dinanath and Suhasini's younger son; Tannu's husband, Shaurya's younger brother;Mannu's elder brother
- Dhruvee Haldanker as Suhasini Chauhan aka Su:
  - Dinanath's wife, Dhannu and Tannu's mother-in-law, Shaurya, Garv and Mannu's mother; Damyanti's daughter-in-law
- Sameer S Sharma as Fateh Singh / Fateh Mama:
  - An innocent worker at DN's house

=== Recurring ===
- Charu Rohatgi as Damyanti Chauhan/Dadi:
  - Suhasini's mother-in-law; Dhannu and Tannu's grandmother-in-law, Dinanath's mother, Shaurya, Garv and Mannu's grandmother
- Shraman Jain as Amar Bhatia/Dr. Amar Bhatia (fake identity):
  - Prem's best friend
- Aditya Kapadia as Prem Kumar/Promila Bhattacharya Bhatia (fake identity):
  - Amar's best friend; Mannu's love interest
- Ranjeet as Gamosha

=== Cameos ===
- KK Goswami as Missile Thief
- Anita Hassanandani as Mohini Iyer
- Ali Asgar as Katappi (Guddu)
- Aryan Prajapati as Fake Dada Ji
- Praneet Bhat as Kilmish Jadugar
- Sweety Walia as Chanda Chadda
- Gaurav Wadhwa as Manav (NRI)
- Shafaq Naaz as one of the fake Trideviyaan
