= Payo Ji Maine Ram Ratan Dhan Payo =

Rajasthani language poem by 15th- century Indian poet Mirabai

Payo Ji Maine Ram Ratan Dhan Payo (transl. I have attained the treasure of God's name) is a Rajasthani language poem by 15th- century Indian poet Mirabai. In this poem, Mirabai says that she attains a great wealth of God's name. The poem was popularized by Indian singer, D. V. Paluskar, and later also by Lata Mangeshkar (1929–2022).

== Lyrics ==
Original Hindi Lyrics:

पायो जी मैंने राम रतन धन पायो ।
वस्तु अमोलिक दी मेरे सतगुरु, किरपा करी अपनायो ॥
जनम जनम की पूँजी पाई, जगमें सभी खोवायो ।
खरचै न खूटै चोर न लूटै दिन दिन बढ़त सवायो ॥
सत की नाव खेवटिया सतगुरु भवसागर तर आयो ।
मीरा के प्रभु गिरिधर नागर हरख हरख जस गायो ॥

— मिराबाई

English Translation:

I have attained the treasure of God's name. My Guru God, gifted me with this priceless gift, and I have accepted this with great gratitude.

I found the most desired treasure of my life, but have lost the worldly humdrum possessions of the world. This treasure of Lord's name, neither gets extinguished, nor gets stolen by thieves. Actually, it gets increases multiple times day by day.

The boat of truth is rowed by my guide God, and thus, I crossed this ocean of life. Meera says, O my beloved Krishna! I sing thy praise with great euphoria and joy.

— Mirabai

== See also ==
- Meerabai
- Saanson ki mala pe
