= Paridhi Sharma =

Indian television actress

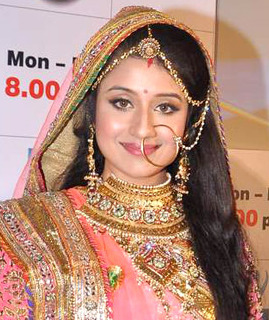
- Sharma in 2013
- Born: 15 May 1987 (age 39); Indore, Madhya Pradesh, India
- Occupation: Actress
- Years active: 2010–present
- Spouse: Tanmai Saxena (m. 2009)
- Children: 1

Paridhi Sharma (born 15 May 1987) is an Indian television actress best known for playing Jodha Bai in Zee TV's Jodha Akbar and Goddess Vaishno Devi in Jag Janani Maa Vaishno Devi - Kahani Mata Rani Ki. She also played the role of Babita Chaddha in Sony Entertainment Television's Patiala Babes and Ambika in &TV's Yeh Kahan Aa Gaye Hum.

== Personal life ==
Paridhi Sharma was born in Indore, Madhya Pradesh, India on 15 May 1987. In 2009, she married Ahmedabad-based businessman Tanmai Saksena. They have a son together, who was born in 2016.

== Media image ==
Sharma was named Top Television Actress by Rediff's in their Top 10 Television Actresses List of 2014.

== Filmography ==
=== Films ===
Year	Title	Role	Notes	Ref.
2018	Green	Dr. Nandini Kumar		
2019	Meethi Eid	Jyoti’s mother	Short film	
2025	Haq	Iram Khan		

=== Television ===
Year	Title	Role	Notes	Ref.
2010	Tere Mere Sapne	Meera / Rani		
2011	Ruk Jaana Nahin	Mehek		
2013–2015	Jodha Akbar	Jodha Bai		
2015	Code Red	Host		
2016	Yeh Kahan Aa Gaye Hum	Ambika		
2018–2019	Patiala Babes	Babita "Babes" Chadda Singh		
2020	Jag Janani Maa Vaishno Devi – Kahani Mata Rani Ki	Vaishno Devi		
2021–2022	Chikoo Ki Mummy Durr Kei	Nupur Joshi		
2023–2024	Siikho	Host		

== Awards ==
Year	Award	Category	Work	Result	Ref.
2014	Zee Gold Awards	Best Fresh New Face (Female)	Jodha Akbar	Won	
2014	Indian Telly Awards	Best Fresh New Face (Female)	Jodha Akbar	Won	
