= Mirabai =

Hindu mystic poet (1499–1546)

Sant Mirabai
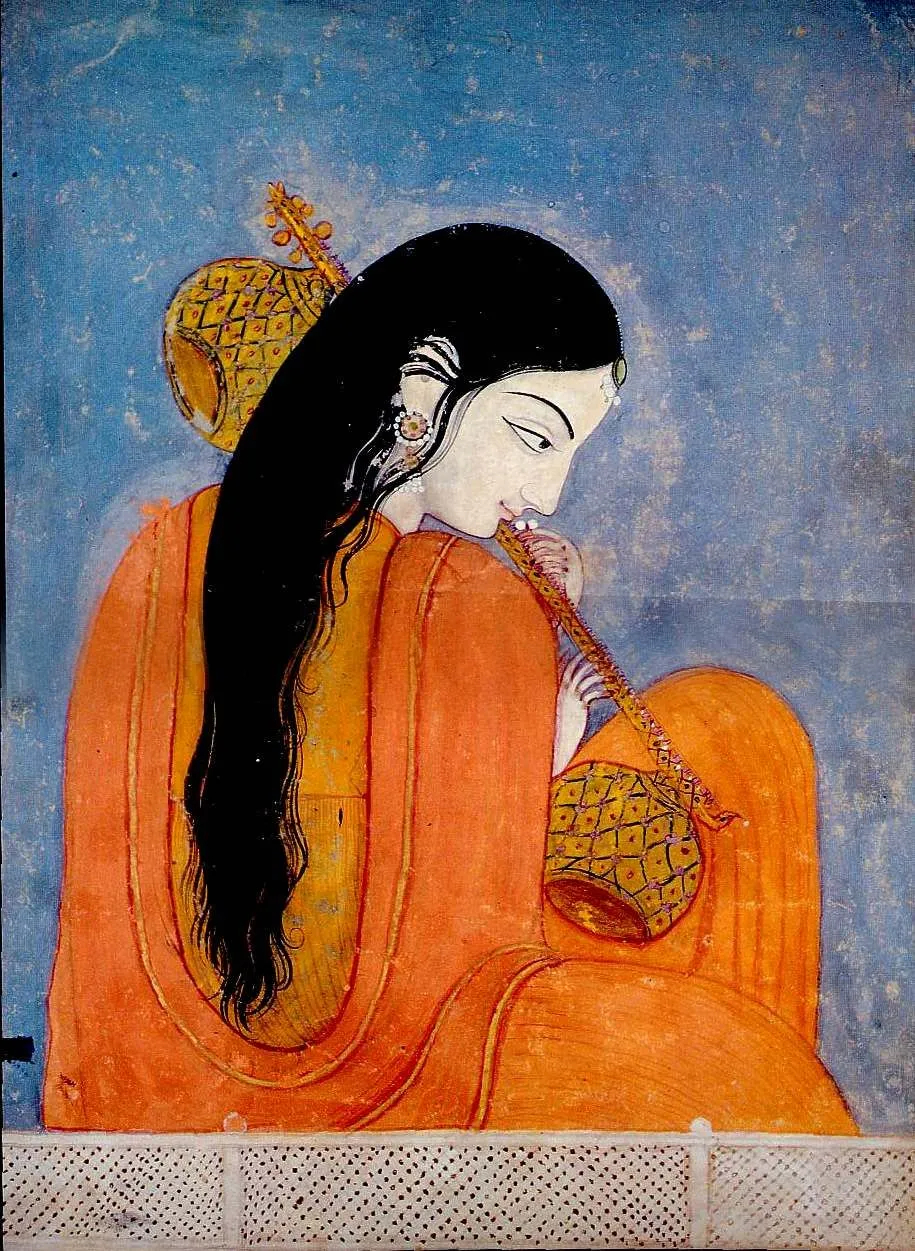
- Kangra painting of Mirabai playing the veena

Personal life
- Born: Mihira c.1498 Kudki, Kingdom of Marwar (present-day) Rajasthan, India
- Died: c. 1546 (aged 47–48) Dwarka (present-day) Gujarat, India
- Spouse: Bhojraj Singh Sisodia (m. 1516; died 1521)
- Parents: Rao Ratan Singh Rathore (father); Veer Kanwar (mother)
- Dynasty: Rathore (by birth); Sisodia (by marriage)
- Known for: Poems, Bhakti for Krishna
- Other names: • Meera; • Mirabai
- Honors: Sant (Saint)

Religious life
- Religion: Hinduism
- Philosophy: Vaishnavism

Religious career
- Teacher: Ravidas
- Disciple of: Ravidas
- Dynasty: Rathore (by birth); Sisodia (by marriage)

Meera, better known as Meera bai, and venerated as Sant Meerabai, was a 16th-century Hindu mystic poet and devotee of Krishna. She is a celebrated Bhakti saint, particularly in the North Indian Hindu tradition. She is mentioned in Bhaktamal, confirming that she was widely known and a cherished figure in the Bhakti movement by about 1600. In her poems, she expressed the madhurya bhava towards Krishna.

Most legends about Mirabai mention her fearless disregard for social and family conventions, her devotion to Krishna, and her persecution by her in-laws for her religious devotion. Her in-laws never liked her passion for music, through which she expressed her devotion, and they considered it an insult to the upper-caste people. It is said that amongst her in-laws, her husband was the only one to love and support her in her Bhakti, while some believed him to have opposed it. She has been the subject of numerous folk tales and hagiographic legends, which are inconsistent or widely different in details. According to legend, when her in-laws attempted to murder her with poison, Mirabai tied a sacred thread on a murti of Krishna, trusting in His divine protection, through which she was saved by divine intervention. This legend is sometimes cited as the origin of the ritual of tying rakhi on Krishna's murti.

Millions of devotional hymns in passionate praise of Krishna are attributed to Mirabai in the Indian tradition, but just a few hundred are believed to be authentic by scholars, and the earliest written records suggest that, except for two hymns, most were first written down in the 18th century. Many poems attributed to Mirabai were likely composed later by others who admired Mirabai. These hymns, also called Bhajan are very famous across India.

Some Hindu temples, such as one within Chittor Fort, are dedicated to Mirabai's memory. Legends about Mirabai's life, of contested authenticity, have been the subject of movies, films, comic strips and other popular literature in modern times.

== Biography ==
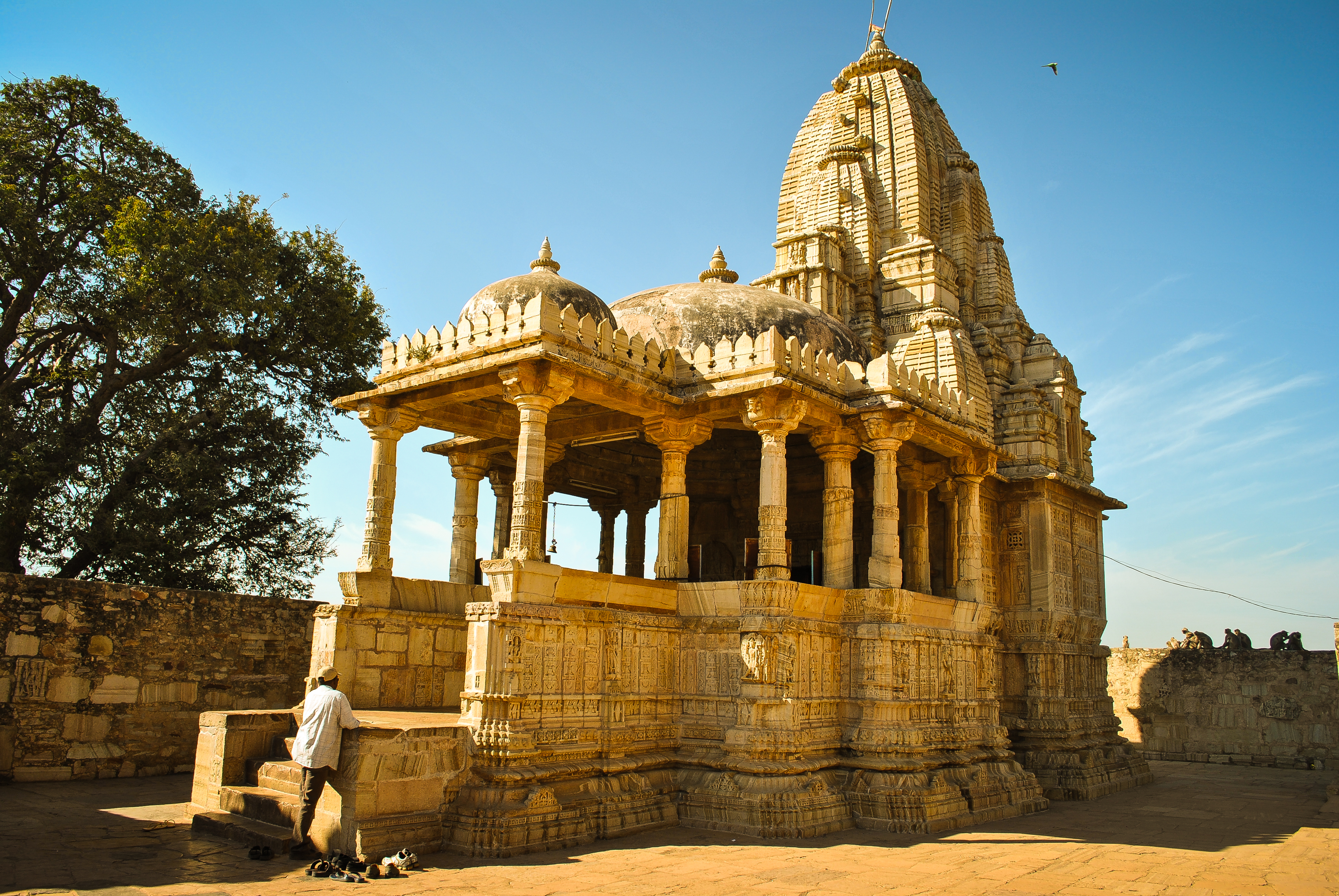
Meera's temple to Krishna at Chittor Fort, Rajasthan

Mirabai was born into a Rathore Rajput royal family in Kudki (modern-day Beawar district of Rajasthan), and spent her childhood in Merta. She was the daughter of Ratan Singh Rathore and granddaughter of Rao Dudaji of Merta, thus making her a great-granddaughter of Rao Jodha and a cousin of Jaimal Rathore.

Mirabai had an arranged marriage with Bhoj Raj, the crown prince of Mewar, in 1516. Her husband was wounded in one of the ongoing wars with the Delhi Sultanate in 1518, and he died from battle wounds in 1521. Both her father and father-in-law (Rana Sanga) died a few days after their defeat in the Battle of Khanwa against Babur, the first Mughal Emperor.

After the death of Rana Sanga, Vikram Singh became the ruler of Mewar. According to a popular legend, her in-laws tried to assassinate her multiple times. These attempts included sending Mirabai a glass of poison and telling her it was nectar, and sending her a basket with a snake instead of flowers. According to hagiographic legends, she was not harmed in either case, with the snake miraculously becoming, depending on the version, a Krishna idol or a garland of flowers. In another version of these legends, she was asked by Vikram Singh to drown herself. When she attempts to do so, she merely floats on the water. Yet another legend states that the third Mughal emperor, Akbar, came with Tansen to visit Mirabai and presented her with a pearl necklace. Scholars doubt this happened, as Tansen joined Akbar's court in 1562, 15 years after Mirabai's death. Similarly, some stories state that Ravidas was her guru (teacher), but there is no corroborating historical evidence for this.

As of 2014, the three oldest records that mention Mirabai are all from the 17th century and were written within 150 years of Mirabai's death. None mention anything about her childhood, the circumstances of her marriage to Bhojraj or whether the people who persecuted her were her in-laws or from some Rajput royal family. Nancy Martin-Kershaw states that to the extent that Mirabai was challenged and persecuted, religious or social conventions were unlikely to have been the cause, rather the likely cause was political chaos and military conflicts between the Rajput kingdom and the Mughal Empire.

Other stories state that Mirabai left the kingdom of Mewar and went on pilgrimages. In her last years, Mirabai lived in Dwarka or Vrindavan, where legends state she miraculously disappeared by merging into an idol of Krishna after being poisoned by her brother-in-law in 1547. While miracles are contested by scholars for the lack of historical evidence, it is widely acknowledged that Mirabai dedicated her life to Krishna, composing songs of devotion, and was one of the most important poet-saints of the Bhakti movement period.

=== Hagiographical variations ===
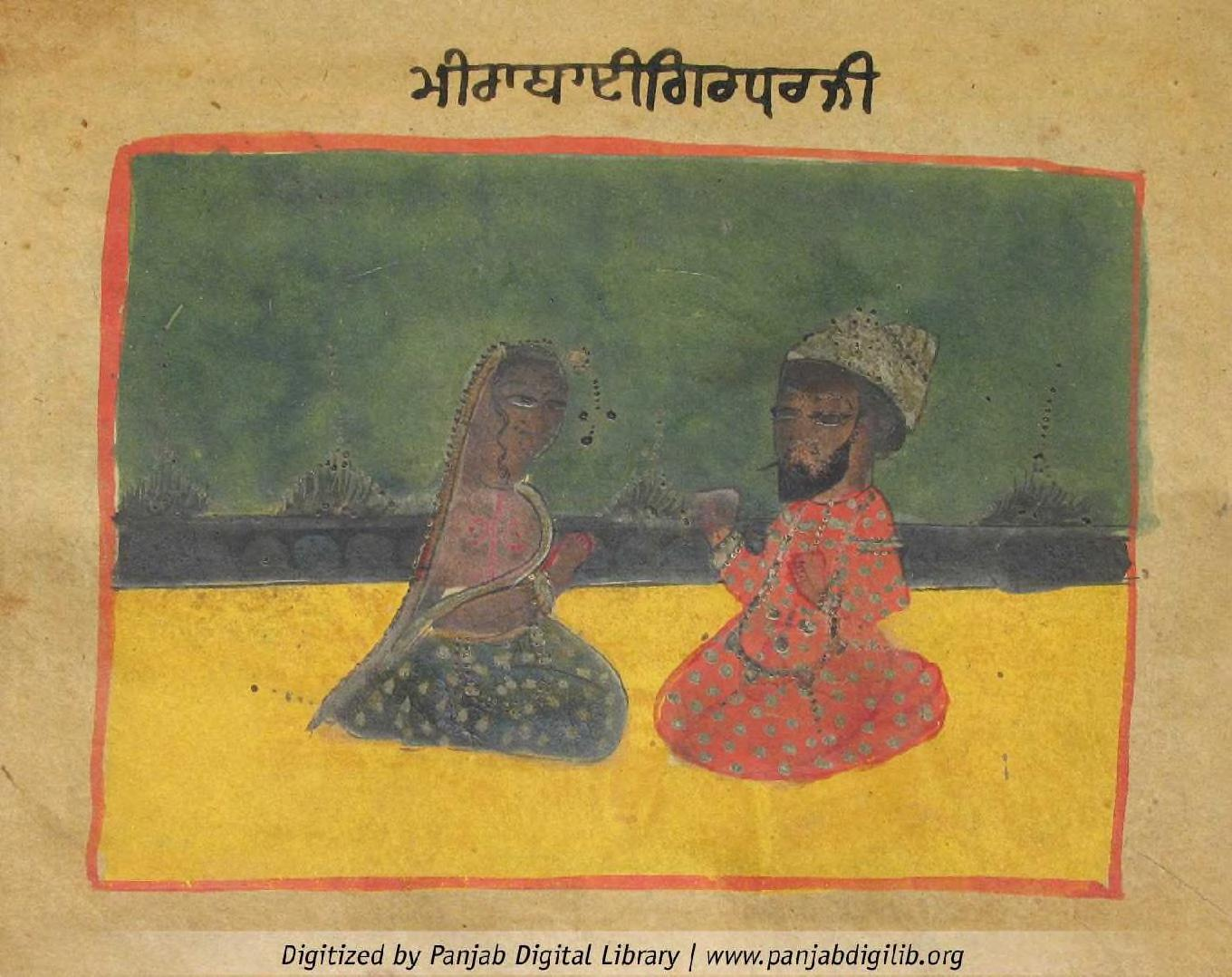
Painting of Mirabai and Girdharji, from a folio within an illustrated manuscript of the Prem Ambodh Pothi

Scholarly analysis of Mirabai's hagiography shows significant regional variation. In contrast to the traditional Mewari depiction of Mirabai traveling to Vrindavan and Dwarka after conflicts with her in-laws at Chittor, an early 18th-century Punjabi text written in Gurmukhi titled Prem Ambodh Pothi ("Ocean of Love", composed c. 1693 CE and related to the court of Guru Gobind Singh) portrays her as sedentary and residing in Udaipur. In this version, she is married to a man named Giridhar (Mountain Lifter) and her own father attempts to kill her with a poison and then a sword, the action of which is thwarted after Krishna manifests wielding the sudarshan chakra.

== Poetry ==
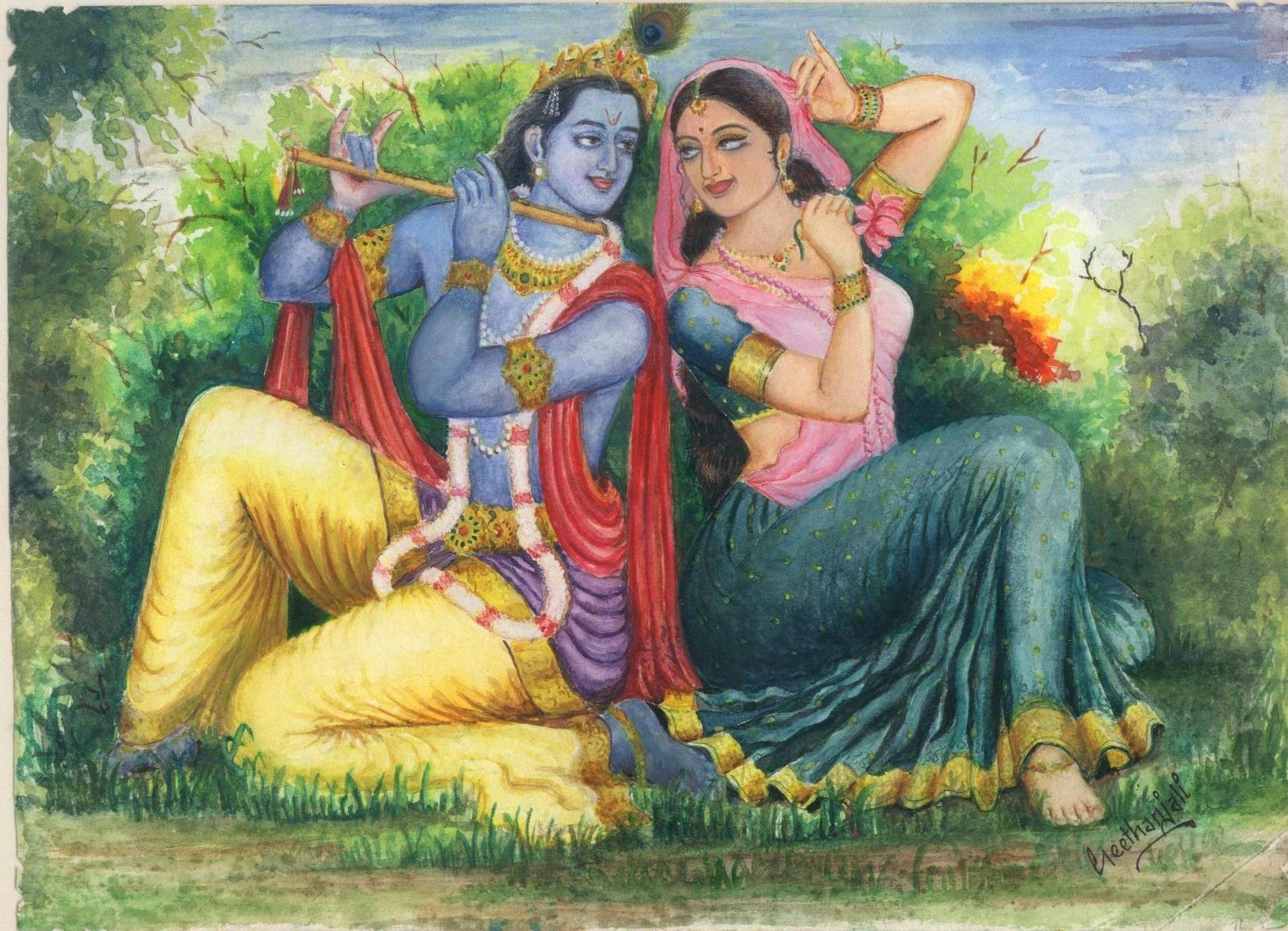
Most of Meera's poems are dedicated to God in the form of Krishna (left) and some poems include Radha (right), the chief consort of Krishna.

The earliest datable reference to Mira is a poem in her praise in Nabhadas's Bhaktamal, a hagiographical anthology composed in about 1600. A number of compositions by Mirabai continue to be sung today in India, mostly as devotional songs (bhajans) towards Krishna, though nearly all of them have a philosophical connotation. Her poems describe her love, salutation, and separation from Krishna, and her dissatisfaction with the world. One of her most popular compositions remains "Payoji maine Ram Ratan dhan payo" (पायो जी मैंने राम रतन धन पायो।, "I have been given the richness of God's name blessing"). Mirabai's poems are lyrical padas (metric verses) in the Rajasthani language. Several meters are used within her padas, but the most common meter found is the mātric (syllabic) poetic line. Rāgas or melodies are attributed to these padas, allowing them to be sung.

Her poetry frequently invokes the epithet Girdhar nagar (the gallant "Mountain bearer) and emphasizes her total surrender to him as her only true spouse. In her poignant poems of separation, or viraha, she occasionally characterizes Krishna as a detached yogi or renouncer who seduces lovers only to leave them in agony, an emotional intensity often mirrored in her use of nature imagery - such as the arrival of the monsoon and the cries of peacocks and cuckoos - to reflect the shifting flavours of union and longing.

Mirabai's appeal transcends social boundaries, resonating with high-caste individuals through her royal suffering and with low-caste groups who admire her renunciation of status and her choice of the untouchable leather-worker Raidas as her guru. By identifying with the gopis of ancient Braj, she manifested a depth of unconditional love that the hagiographer Nabhadas noted as remarkable for a "degenerate age". While thousands of verses are attributed to her, scholars remain divided on how many she actually penned.

While hundreds of verses are attributed to her, scholars are divided as to how many of them were actually penned by Mirabai herself. The manuscript record for Mira's poetry is unusually thin. Only two poems attributed to her have been found in manuscripts dating from before the early eighteenth century, a far smaller number than survives for male poet-saints of comparable stature, and a search of manuscript libraries in Rajasthan found no examples earlier than the latter half of the eighteenth century, with only a handful predating 1800. The critical edition of Parasuram Caturvedi, on which most modern assessments of Mira rest, contains no reference to the manuscripts on which it is based. Consequently, researchers often identify a specific Mirabai style of devotion, seeing her songs as inseparable from her legendary life story and representing a unique identification between the author and the subject of her devotion.

=== Hindi and Rajasthani ===
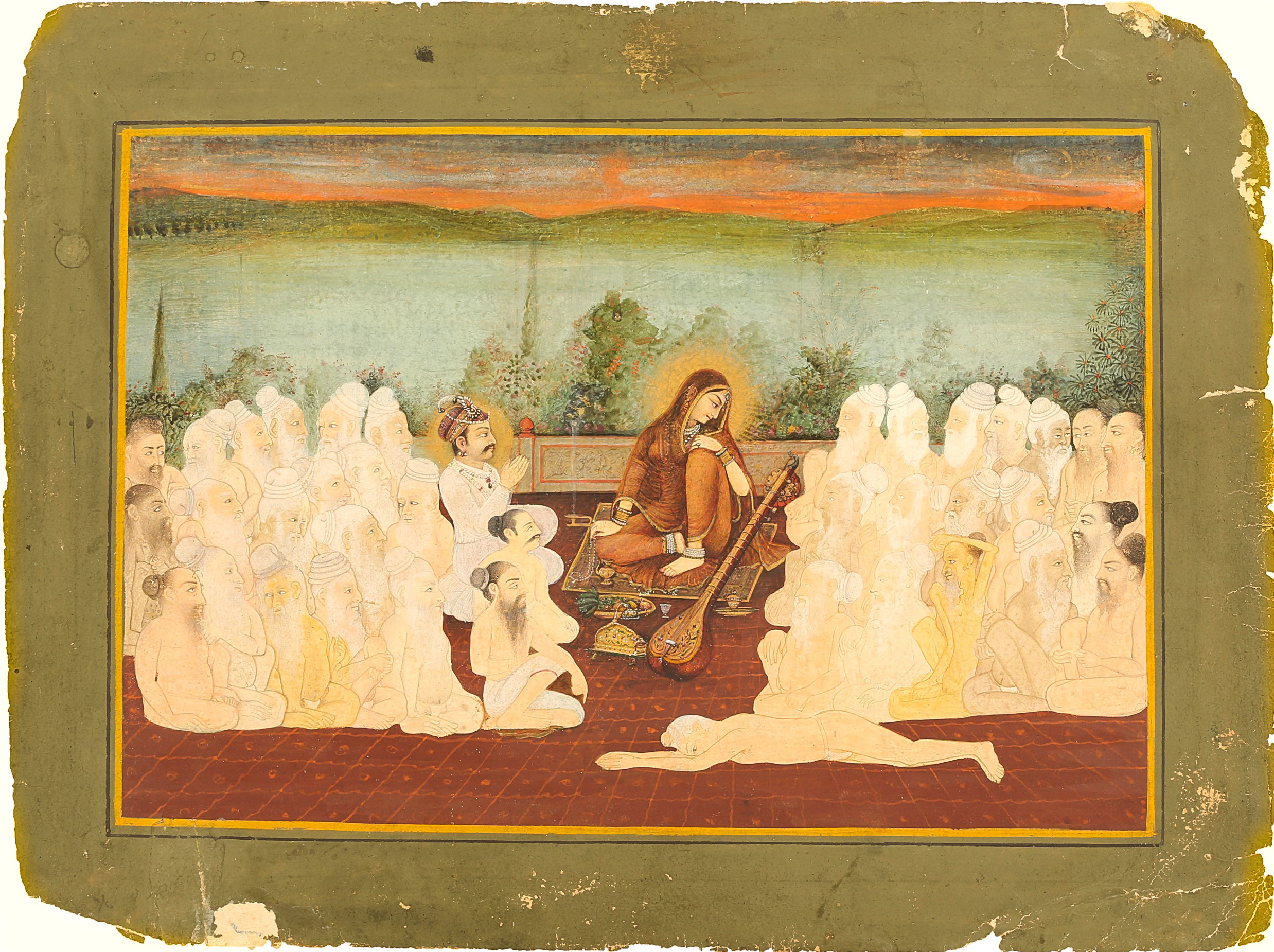
Mirabai surrounded by devotees, c. 17th–18th century

The most extensive collection of Mirabai's poems exists in manuscripts from the 19th century. To establish the authenticity of the poems, scholars have looked at various factors such as the mention of Mirabai in other manuscripts, as well as the style, language, and form of the poems. John Stratton Hawley cautions, "When one speaks of the poetry of Mirabai, then, there is always an element of enigma. [...] There must always remain a question about whether there is any real relation between the poems we cite and a historical Mira."

In her poems, Krishna is a yogi and lover, and she herself is a yogini ready to take her place by his side in spiritual marital bliss. Meera's style combines impassioned mood, defiance, longing, anticipation, joy and ecstasy of union, always centred on Krishna.

My Dark One has gone to an alien land.
He has left me behind, he's never returned, he's never sent me a single word.
So I've stripped off my ornaments, jewels, and adornments, and cut my hair from my head.
And put on holy garments, all on his account, seeking him in all four directions.
Mira: unless she meets the Dark One, her God, she doesn't even want to live.

— Mira Bai, Translated by John Stratton Hawley

Mirabai speaks of a personal relationship with Krishna as her lover, God and mountain lifter. The characteristic of her poetry is complete surrender.

After making me fall for you so hard, where are you going?
Until the day I see you, no repose: my life, like a fish washed on shore, flails in agony.
For your sake I'll make myself a yogini, I'll hurl myself to death on the saw of Kashi.
Mira's God is the clever Mountain Lifter, and I am his, a slave to his lotus feet.

— Mira Bai, Translated by John Stratton Hawley

Mirabai is often classed with the northern Sant bhaktis, who spoke of Krishna.

=== Ravidas as Mira's Guru ===
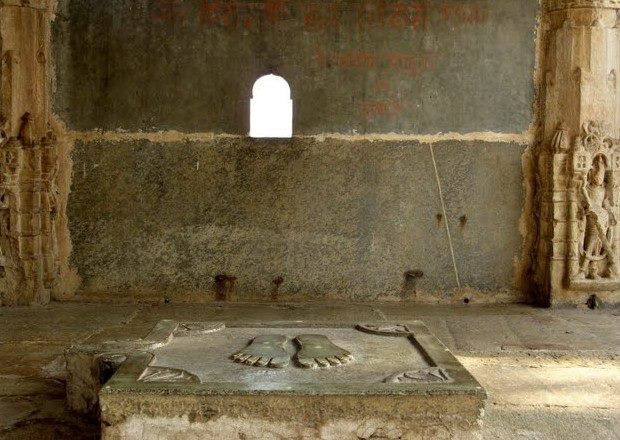
Engraved footprints of Guru Ravidass at Kumbha Shyam Temple, Chittorgarh

There is a small chhatri (pavilion) in front of Meera's temple in Chittorgarh district of Rajasthan which bears Ravidas' engraved footprint. Legends link him as the guru of Mirabai, another major Bhakti movement poet.

Mirabai composed a song dedicated to Guru Ravidas, in which she mentioned him as her Guru:

Sadguru sant mile Ravidas
Mira devaki kare vandana aas
Jin chetan kahya dhann Bhagavan Ravidas

-- "I got a guru in the form of Sant Ravidas, there by obtaining life's fulfillment."

=== Sikh literature ===
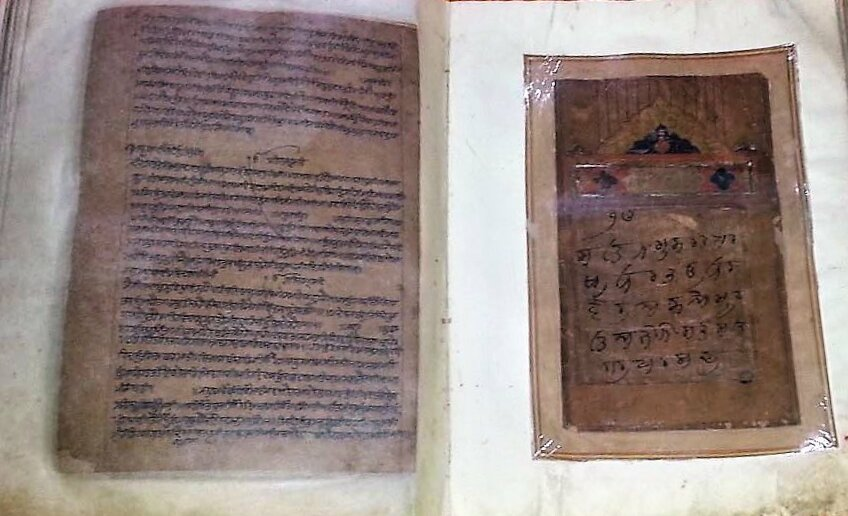
Manuscript of the Adi Granth from the Bhai Banno recension named "Bhai Banno Vali Bir" which contains compositions of Mirabai within it. Kept at Gurdwara Bhai Banno Sahib, Kanpur Uttar Pradesh, India

When the Adi Granth was compiled in 1604, a copy of the text was given to a Sikh named Bhai Banno, who was instructed by Guru Arjan to travel to Lahore to get it bound. While doing so, he made a copy of the codex, which included compositions of Mirabai. These unauthorized additions were not included in the standardized edition of the scripture by the Sikh gurus, who rejected their inclusion.

Prem Ambodh Pothi, a text attributed to Guru Gobind Singh and completed in 1693 CE, includes poetry of Mira Bai as one of the sixteen historic bhakti saints important to Sikhism.

== Mirabai's compositions ==
- Raag Govind
- Govind Tika
- Raag Soratha
- Meera Ki Malhar
- Mira Padavali
- Narsi ji Ka Mayara
- Sanson Ki Mala Pe

== Influence ==
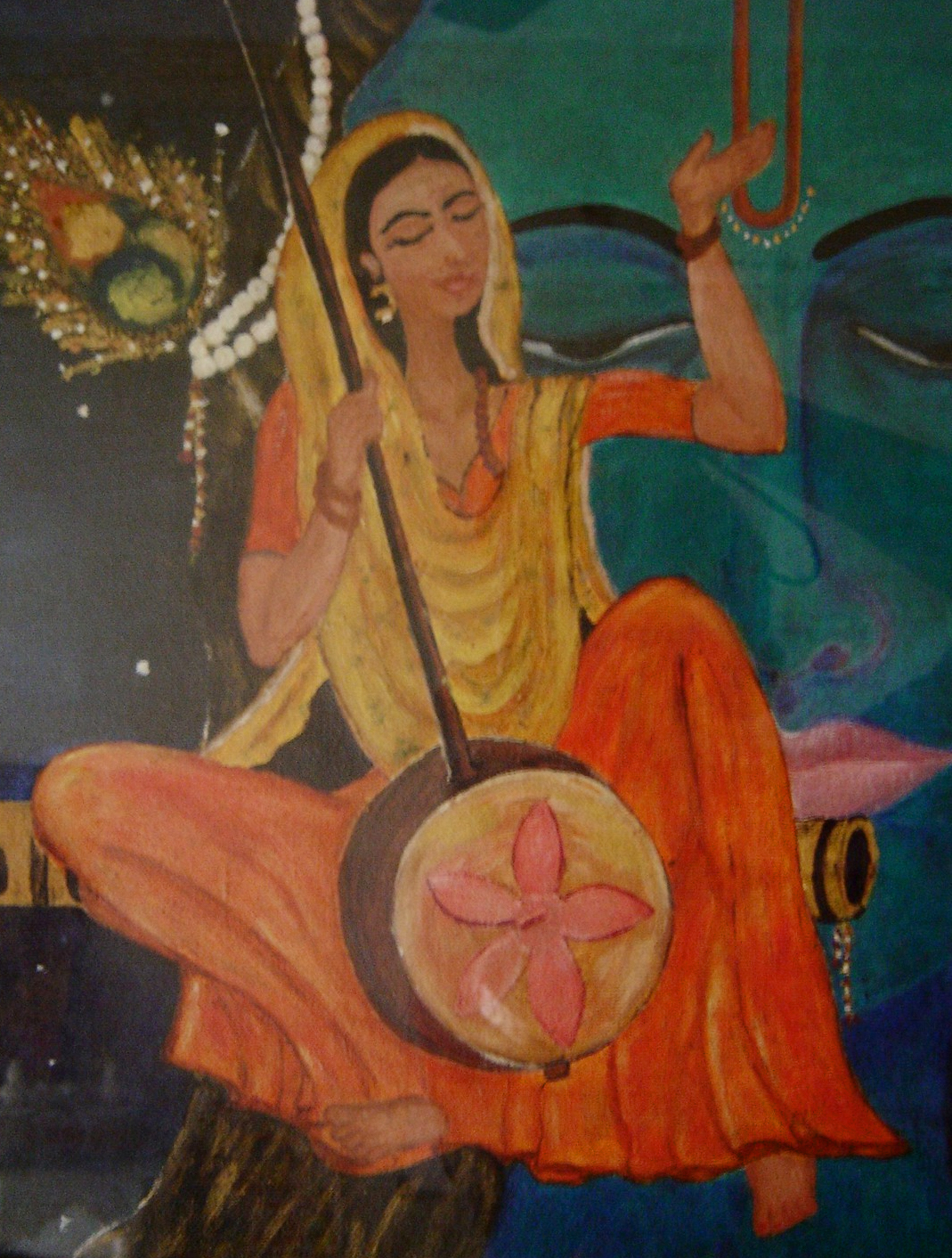
A modern painting of Mirabai

Scholars acknowledge that Mirabai was one of the central poet-saints of the Bhakti movement, a period in Indian history rife with religious conflicts. Yet, they simultaneously question the extent to which Mirabai was a canonical projection of social imagination that followed, where she became a symbol of people's suffering and a desire for an alternative. Dirk Wiemann, quoting Parita Mukta, states,

If one accepts that someone very akin to the Mira legend [about persecution and her devotion] existed as an actual social being, the power of her convictions broke the brutal feudal relationships that existed at that time. The Mira Bai of the popular imagination, then, is an intensely anachronistic figure by virtue of that anticipatory radical democracy which propels Meera out of the historicity that remains nonetheless ascribed to her. She goes beyond the shadowy realms of the past to inhabit the very core of a future which is embodied within the suffering of a people who seek an alternative.

— Dirk Wiemann / Parita Mukta, On Meera

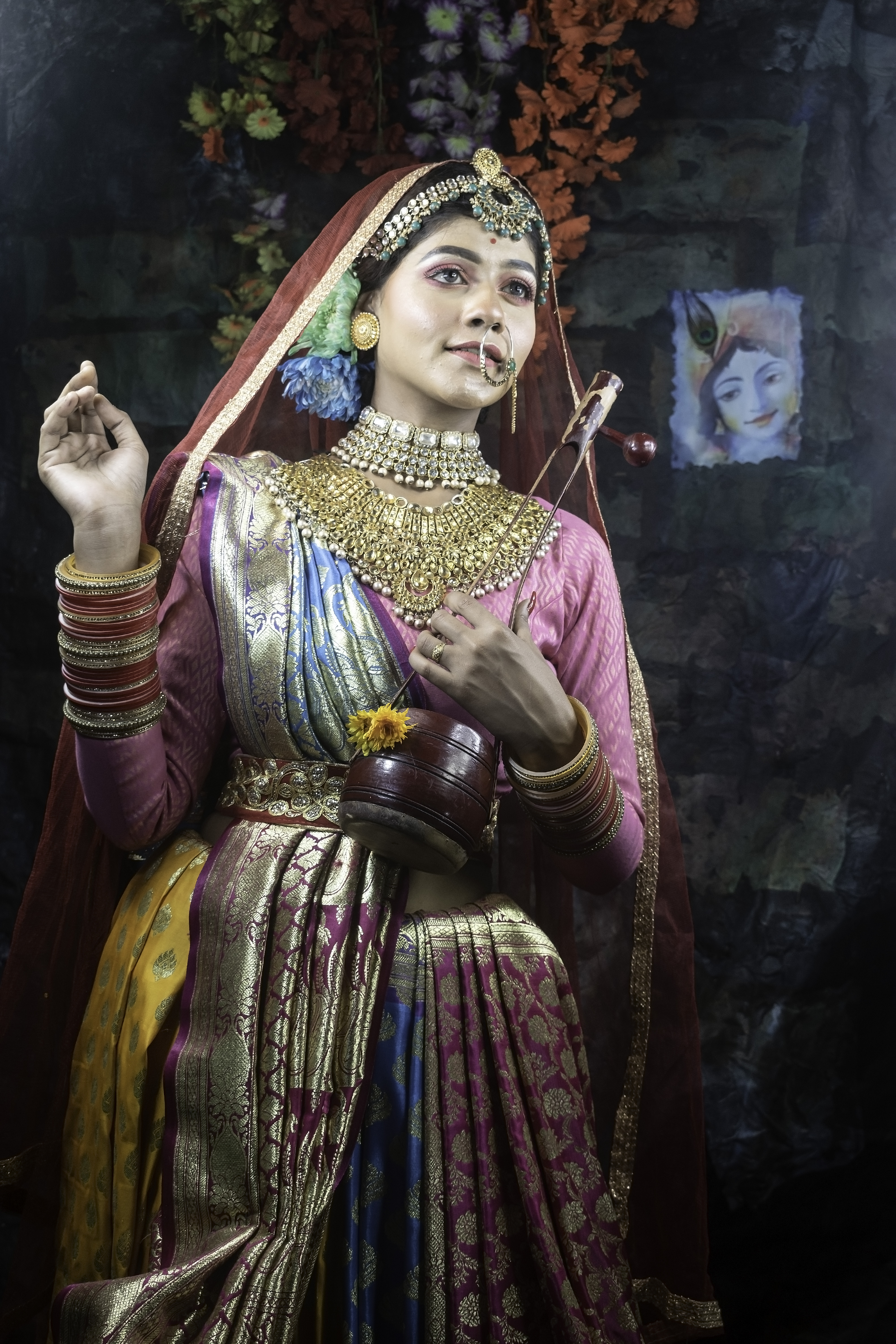
Modern stage performance about Mirabai

The continued influence of Mirabai, in part, has been her message of freedom, her resolve and right to pursue her devotion to Krishna and her spiritual beliefs as she felt drawn to despite her persecution. Her appeal and influence in Indian culture, writes Edwin Bryant, is from her emerging, through her legends and poems, as a person "who stands up for what is right and suffers bitterly for holding fast to her convictions, as other men and women have", yet she does so with a language of love, with words painting the "full range of emotions that mark love, whether between human beings or between human and divine".

From the 18th century onward, Mirabai's story was actively retold and adapted to reflect the theological and social values of different communities. These accounts focused less on historical fact and more on serving as a form of religious practice to inspire devotion.

== English translations ==
English translations of Mirabai's poems titled Mystic Songs of Meera and The Devotional Poems of Mirabai have been written by A.J. Alston and V.K. Subramanian respectively. Some bhajans of Meera have been rendered into English by Robert Bly and Jane Hirshfield as Mirabai: Ecstatic Poems. Schelling and Landes-Levi have offered anthologies in the USA. Snell has presented parallel translations in his collection The Hindi Classical Tradition. Sethi has selected poems which Meera composed presumably after she came in contact with Ravidas.

== Popular culture ==
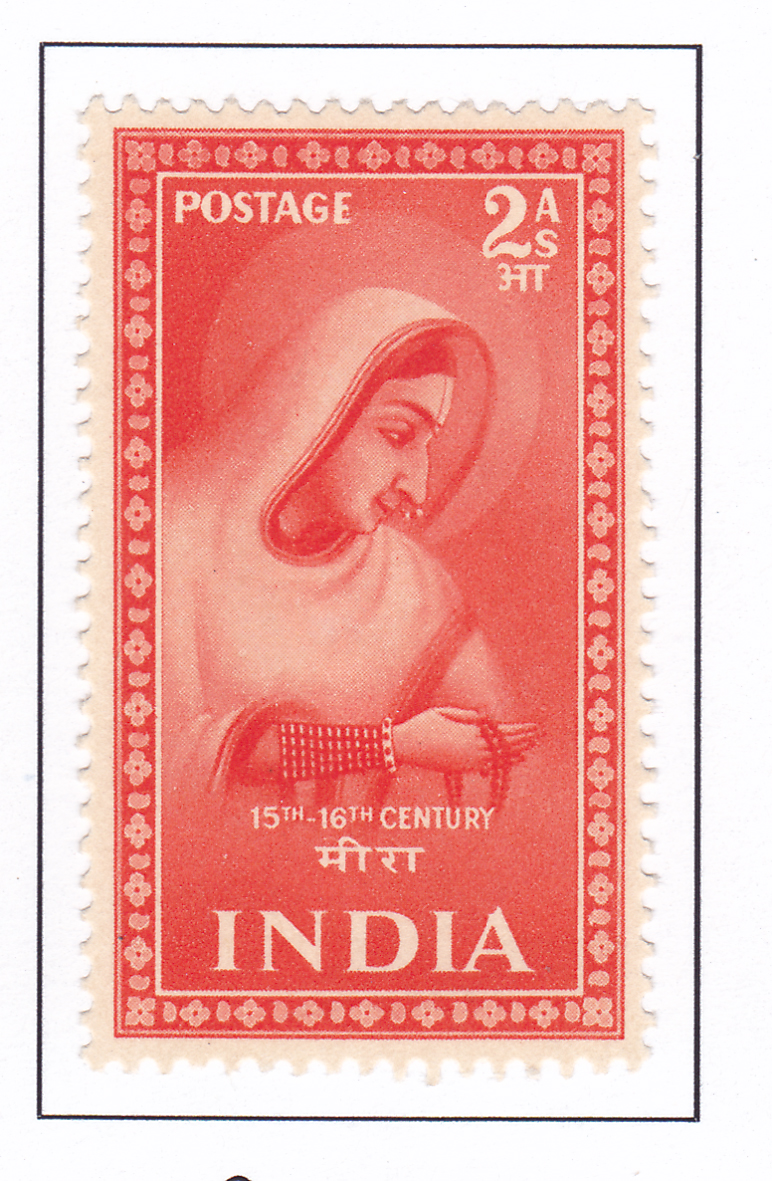
A commemorative postage stamp on Mira issued by India Post Date of Issue: 1st October 1952

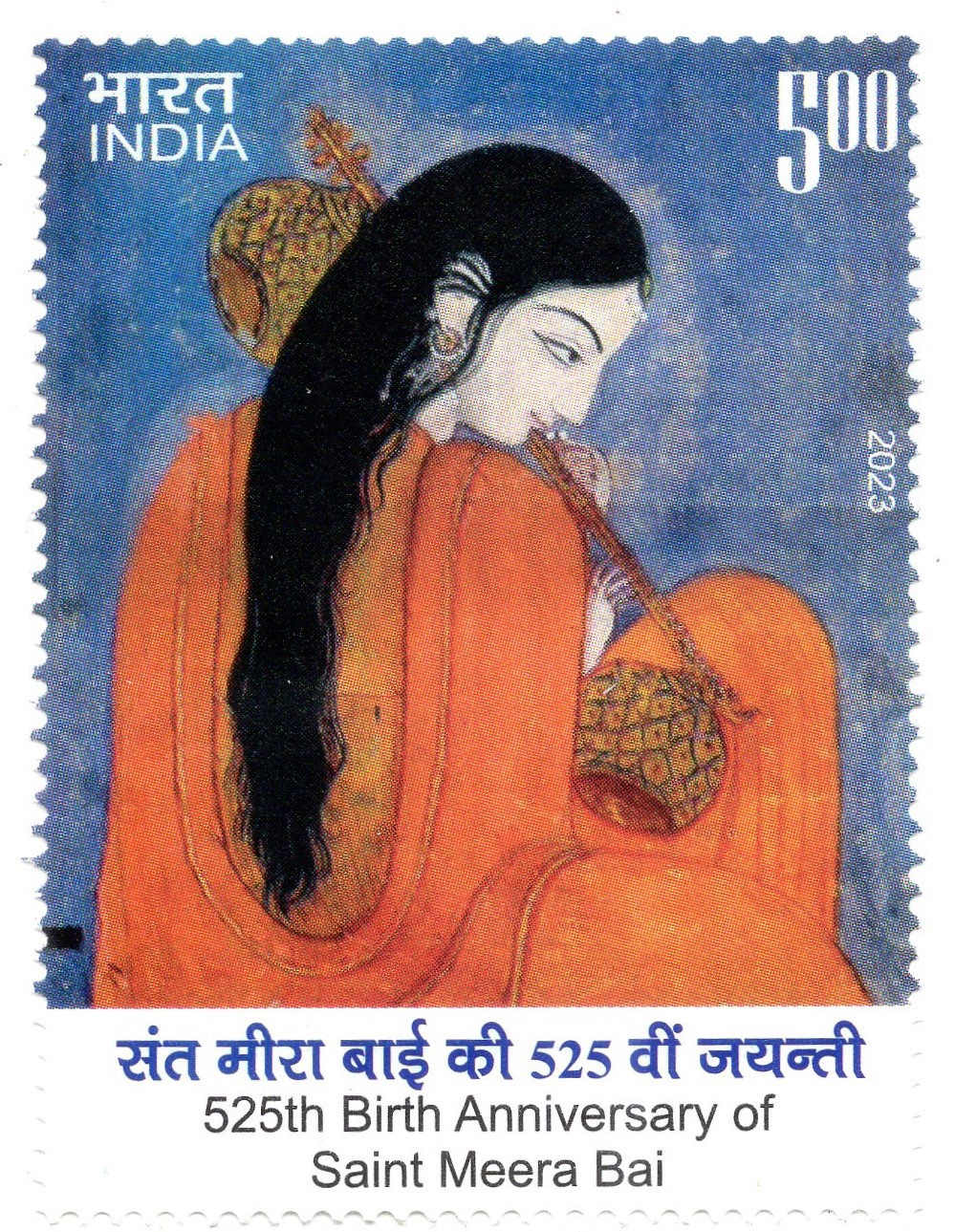
525th Birth Anniversary of Meera Bai commemorative postal stamp 2023

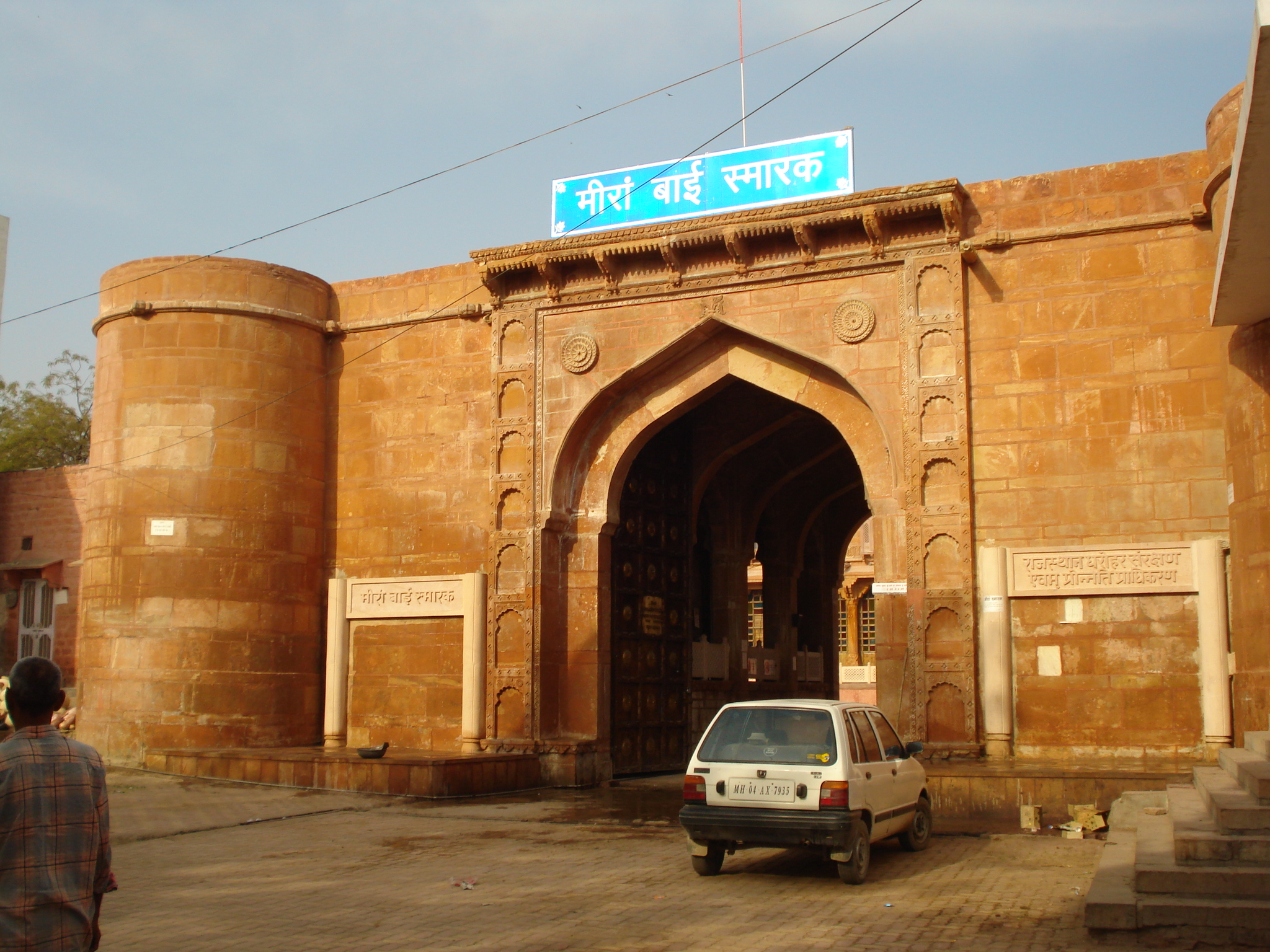
Mirabai Museum Merta

Composer John Harbison adapted Bly's translations for his Mirabai Songs.

The 1997 novel Cuckold, by Kiran Nagarkar, features her as one of the central characters.

In 2002, Indian film director Anjali Panjabi released a documentary film about Meera, titled A Few Things I Know About Her.

In 2009, Mirabai's life was interpreted as a musical story in Meera—The Lover…, a music album based on original compositions for some well-known bhajans attributed to her. James, a Bangladeshi musician, dedicated his song "Mirabai" to her.

The Meera Mahal in Merta is a museum dedicated to telling the story of Mirabai through sculptures, paintings, displays, and a shaded garden.

=== Film and TV adaptations ===
Two well-known films of her life have been made in India: Meera (1945), a Tamil language film starring M. S. Subbulakshmi, and Meera (1979), a Hindi film by Gulzar, in which she is portrayed by actress Hema Malini. Other Indian films about her include: Meerabai (1921) by Kanjibhai Rathod, Sant Mirabai (1929) by Dhundiraj Govind Phalke, Rajrani Meera/Meerabai (1933) by Debaki Bose, Meerabai (1936) by T. C. Vadivelu Naicker and A. Narayanan, Sadhvi Meerabai (1937) by Baburao Painter, Bhakta Meera (1938) by Y. V. Rao, Meerabai (1940) by Narasimha Rao Bhimavarapu, Meera (1947) by Ellis Dungan, Matwali Meera (1947) by Baburao Patel, Meerabai (1947) by W. Z. Ahmed, Meerabai (1947) by Nanabhai Bhatt, Girdhar Gopal Ki Mira (1949) by Prafulla Roy, Raj Rani Meera (1956) by G. P. Pawar, Meera Shyam (1976), Meera Ke Girdhar (1992) by Vijay Deep.

Mirabai, a 26-episode series based on her life, starring Mrinal Kulkarni, was produced by UTV in 1997. Meera, a 2009 Indian television series based on her life, aired on NDTV Imagine. Shree Krishna Bhakto Meera, a 2021 Indian Bengali mythological television series based on her life, aired on Star Jalsha. Her life was also chronicled in the longest-running mythological show, Vighnaharta Ganesh, where Lord Ganesh narrates her story to one of Lord Shiva's ganas, Pushpadanta. Mira was portrayed by Lavina Tandon, while Krishna's role was essayed by Hitanshu Jinsi.

Year	Name	Note	Played by	Channel
1997	Mirabai	26 episodes; Director : Ved Rahi	Mrinal Kulkarni	Doordarshan
2009	Meera	135 episodes; Director : Mukesh Singh, Swapnil Mahaling (Shahane)	Aashika Bhatia, Aditi Sajwan	NDTV Imagine
2021	Shree Krishna Bhakto Meera	Director : Amit Sengupta	Arshiya Mukherjee, Debadrita Basu	Star Jalsha

== See also ==
- Bhajan
- Krishna
- Guru Ravidass
- Ravidassia
- Kumbha Shyam Temple, Chittorgarh
