= Break-off =

Break-off may refer to:

- Break-off phenomenon, a psychological effect experienced by astronauts after seeing Earth from space
- Break off or Break shot, a term in billiards for the first shot in most types of billiards games
