= Space psychology =

Psychology applied to spaceflight

Space psychology refers to applying psychology to advise human spaceflight. This includes applying industrial and organizational psychology to team selection, individual and team mental preparation, team training, and ongoing psychological support, and applying human factors and ergonomics to the construction of spacecraft to ensure sufficient habitability.

== Components of industrial/organizational psychology ==
The field is necessary for planning for and accomplishing successful human spaceflight missions by ensuring readiness for the unique physiological and psychological challenges posed by spending extended time in closed isolated environments like spacecraft. It is critical that each team member functions individually and as a team in order to avoid human error, overcome unforeseeable challenges, and complete the mission. Due to the importance of team reliance on mission success, the field has focused on team composition and cohesion in spaceflight missions ever since 1958's Project Mercury. This involves applying and conducting research from social psychology, group dynamics, group performance and team psychology, and applying it to select team members that will be able to live together in close quarters for an extended amount of time, and create team training programs that improve team performance. In addition to teamwork, there is an assortment of psychological and sociological effects of spaceflight that needs to be addressed in order to plan for successful space missions, such as loneliness, unavailability of familial mental health support, elevated levels of stress due to demanding tasks, and reduced material comforts.

== Components of human factors and ergonomics ==
To ensure habitability of constructed spacecraft, human factors and ergonomics specialists must advise on environmental requirements such as lighting, room layout and design, sound requirements, and solutions for the physiological challenges posed by being in an environment without gravity.

Human Factor in space has to deal not only with adapting to different physical habitats, but also to different social habitats and different communication settings. New activities such as performing human extravehicular activity (EVA) beyond the low Earth orbit environment require complex synchronization methods. The ergonomic approach to these environments has to include new variables, such as time delay in communication due to speed of light transmission limitations. Astronauts will become increasingly isolated from Earth-based mission support and thus will rely heavily on their own decision-making capabilities and onboard tools to accomplish proposed EVA mission objectives.

== Research ==
Most published research specific to space psychology has been conducted by NASAs Human Systems Integration Division. Tests conducted to ensure team success include putting a team in airtight quarters on earth for an extended period of time: in the Lunar-Mars Life Support Test. In the context of space flight, teamwork is an essential ingredient in successful missions. A variety of adverse influences may negatively impact the performance of mission teams both on the ground and in flight. Such influences may include physical stressors on the organism such as diurnal disruption, effects of microgravity, injury, or task overload as well as psychological factors such as social isolation, role overload, or interpersonal conflict among team members. Given the importance of team effectiveness, NASA's Behavioral Health and Performance Element (BHP) has identified a need to monitor the functioning of teams, primarily using unobtrusive means. The purpose of such monitoring lies in providing a stream of indicators that can serve several operational goals:

1. Monitoring during personnel selection activities can provide input for the selection of compatible team members and of individuals with psychological profiles suited to teamwork in extreme environments and situations.
2. Monitoring during training activities can provide diagnostic information useful in guiding further instruction and coaching as well as in determining the composition of teams prior to mission deployment.
3. Monitoring during missions can provide forewarning of potential operational failures due to disruptions.

== See also ==
- Psychological and sociological effects of spaceflight
- Effect of spaceflight on the human body – Medical issues associated with spaceflight
- Overview effect – Cognitive shift after seeing Earth from space
