= Vladimir Myasishchev =

Vladimir Myasishchev may refer to:

- Vladimir Myasishchev (psychologist) (1893–1973), psychologist
- Vladimir Myasishchev (engineer) (1902–1978), aircraft designer
