= Psychological and sociological effects of spaceflight =

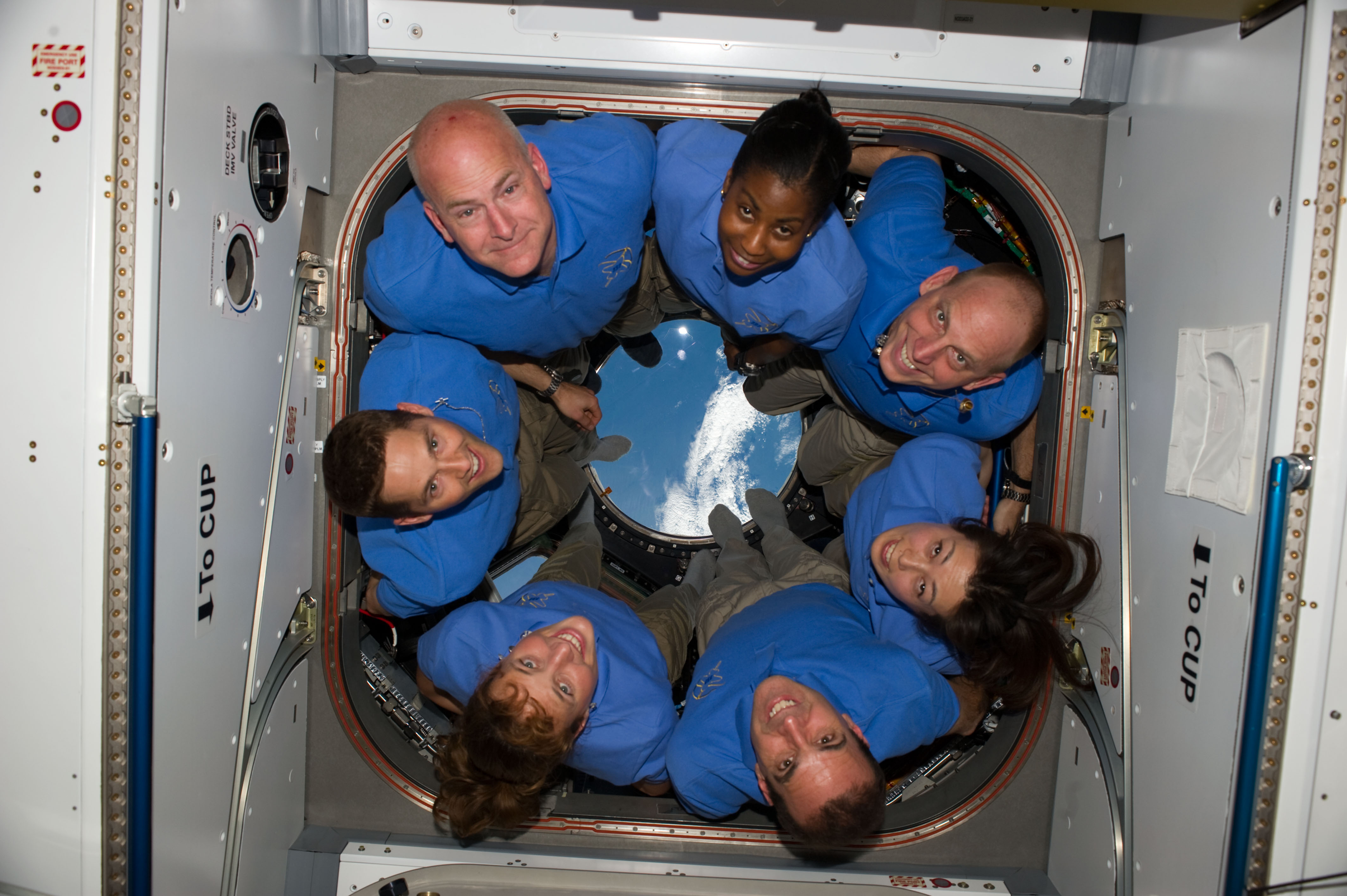
Crew members (STS-131) on the International Space Station (14 April 2010).

Psychological and sociological effects of space flight are important to understanding how to successfully achieve the goals of long-duration expeditionary missions. Although robotic spacecraft have landed on Mars, plans have also been discussed for a human expedition, perhaps in the 2030s, for a return mission.

A Mars return expedition may last two to three years and may involve a crew of four to seven people, although shorter flyby missions of approximately 1 1/2 years with only two people have been proposed, as well as one-way missions that include landing on Mars with no return trip planned. Although there are a number of technological and physiological issues involved with such a mission that remain to be worked out, there are also a number of behavioral issues affecting the crew that are being addressed before launching such missions. In preparing for such an expedition, important psychological, interpersonal, and psychiatric issues occurring in human spaceflight missions are under study by national space agencies and others.

In October 2015, the NASA Office of Inspector General issued a health hazards report related to human spaceflight, including a human mission to Mars.

== Psychosocial issues in-orbit ==
Researchers have conducted two NASA-funded international studies of psychological and interpersonal issues during in-orbit missions to the Mir and the International Space Station. Both crew members and mission control personnel were studied. The Mir sample involved 13 astronauts and cosmonauts and 58 American and Russian mission control personnel. The corresponding numbers in the ISS study were 17 space travelers and 128 people on Earth. Subjects completed a weekly questionnaire that included items from a number of valid and reliable measures that assessed mood and group dynamics. Both studies had similar findings. There was significant evidence for the displacement of tension and negative emotions from the crew members to mission control personnel. The support role of the commander was significantly and positively related to group cohesion among crew members, and both the task and support roles of the team leader were significantly related to cohesion among people in mission control. Crew members scored higher in cultural sophistication than mission control personnel. Russians reported greater language flexibility than Americans. Americans scored higher on a measure of work pressure than Russians, but Russians reported higher levels of tension on the ISS than Americans. There were no significant changes in levels of emotion and group interpersonal climate over time. Specifically, there was no evidence for a general worsening of mood and cohesion after the halfway point of the missions, an occurrence some have called the 3rd quarter phenomenon.

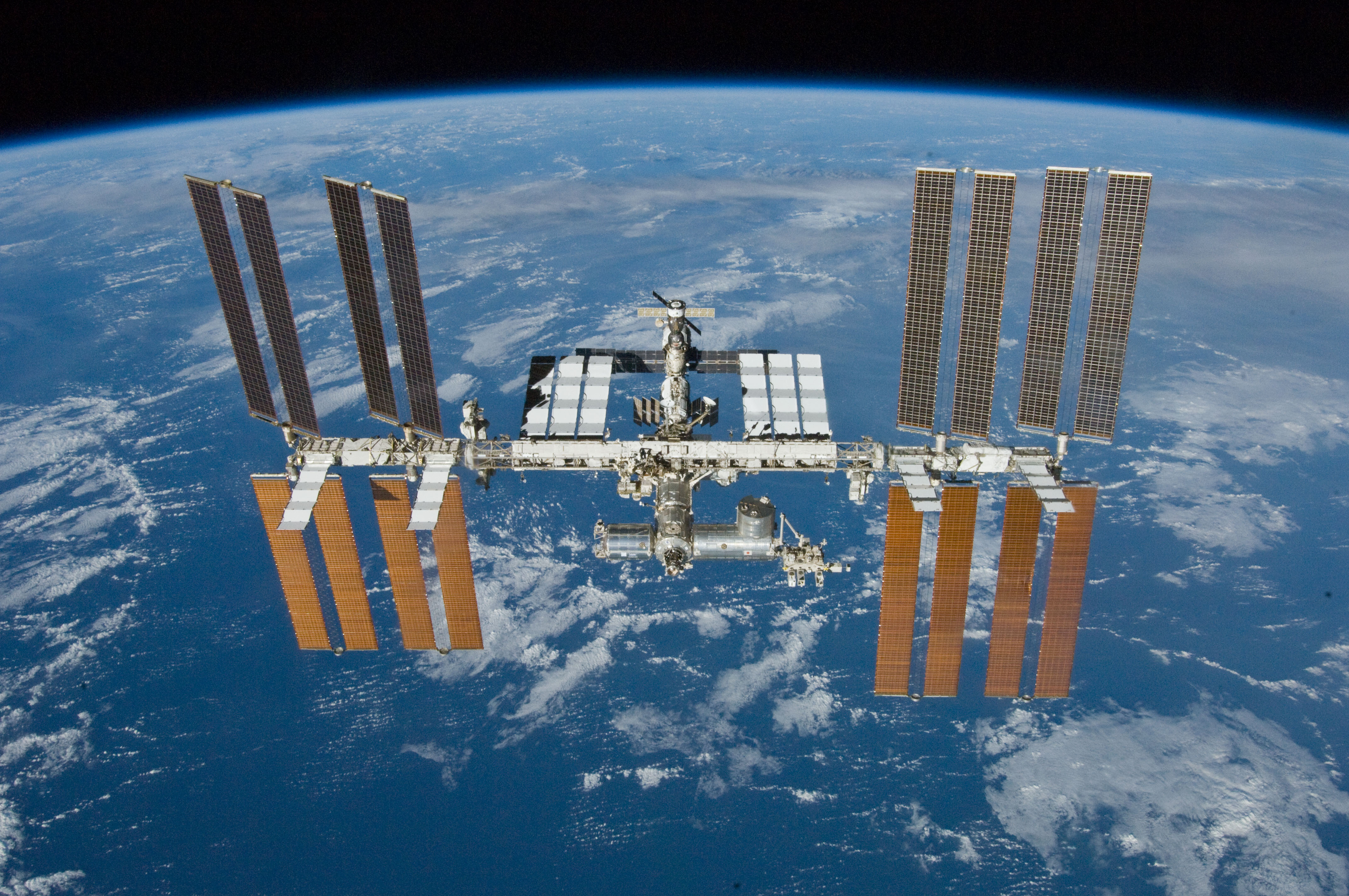
Much has been learned from experiences on the International Space Station about important psychological, interpersonal and psychiatric issues that affect people working on-orbit. This information should be incorporated in the planning for future expeditionary missions to a near-Earth asteroid or to Mars.

Other psychosocial studies involving astronauts and cosmonauts have been conducted. In one, an analysis of speech patterns as well as subjective attitudes and personal values were measured in both on-orbit space crews and people working in space analog environments. The researchers found that, over time, these isolated groups showed decreases in the scope and content of their communications and a filtering in what they said to outside personnel, which was termed psychological closing. Crew members interacted less with some mission control personnel than others, perceiving them as opponents. This tendency of some crew members to become more egocentric was called autonomization. They also found that crew members became more cohesive by spending time together (for example, joint birthday celebrations), and that the presence of subgroups and outliers (e.g., scapegoats) negatively affected group cohesion. In a study of 12 ISS cosmonauts, researchers reported that personal values generally remained stable, with those related to the fulfillment of professional activities and good social relationships being rated most highly.

Another study examined potentially disruptive cultural issues affecting space missions in a survey of 75 astronauts and cosmonauts and 106 mission control personnel. The subjects rated coordination difficulties between the different space organizations involved with the missions as the biggest problem. Other problems included communication misunderstandings and differences in work management styles.

In a study of 11 cosmonauts regarding their opinions of possible psychological and interpersonal problems that might occur during a Mars expedition, researchers found several factors to be rated highly: isolation and monotony, distance-related communication delays with Earth, leadership issues, differences in space agency management styles, and cultural misunderstandings within international crews.

In a survey of 576 employees of the European Space Agency (ESA), a negative link was found between cultural diversity and the ability of people to interact with one another. The more diversity within the crew, the worse the interactions became. Especially important were factors related to leadership and decision-making.

Another study looked at content analysis of personal journals from ten ISS astronauts that were oriented around a number of issues that had behavioral implications. Findings included that 88% of the entries dealt with the following categories: Work, Outside Communications, Adjustment, Group Interaction, Recreation/Leisure, Equipment, Events, Organization/Management, Sleep, and Food. In general, the crew members reported that their life in space was not as difficult as they expected prior to launch, despite a 20% increase in interpersonal problems during the second half of the missions. It was recommended that future crew members be allowed to control their individual schedules as much as possible.

== On-orbit and post-spaceflight psychiatric issues ==
A number of psychiatric problems have been reported during on-orbit space missions. Most common are adjustment reactions to the novelty of being in space, with symptoms generally including transient anxiety or depression. Psychosomatic reactions also have occurred, where anxiety and other emotional states are experienced physically as somatic symptoms. Problems related to major mood and thought disorders (e.g., manic-depression, schizophrenia) have not been reported during space missions. This likely is due to the fact that crew members have been screened psychiatrically for constitutional predispositions to these conditions before launch, so the likelihood of these illnesses developing on-orbit is low.

Post-mission personality changes and emotional problems have affected some returning space travelers. These have included anxiety, depression, excessive alcohol use, and marital readjustment difficulties that in some cases have necessitated the use of psychotherapy and psychoactive medications. Some astronauts have had difficulties adjusting to the resultant fame and media demands that followed their missions, and similar problems are likely to occur in the future following high-profile expeditions, such as a trip to Mars.

Asthenization, a syndrome that includes fatigue, irritability, emotional lability, attention and concentration difficulties, and appetite and sleep problems, has been reported to commonly occur in cosmonauts by Russian flight surgeons. It has been observed to evolve in clearly defined stages. It is conceptualized as an adjustment reaction to being in space that is different from neurasthenia, a related neurotic condition seen on Earth.

The validity of asthenization has been questioned by some in the West, in part because classical neurasthenia is not currently recognized in the American psychiatric nomenclature, whereas the illness is accepted in Russia and China. Retrospective analysis of the data from the Soviet Space Biology and Medicine III Mir Space Station study (see) has shown that the findings did not support the presence of the asthenization syndrome when crew member on-orbit scores were compared with those from a prototype of asthenization developed by Russian space experts.

=== Positive outcomes ===
Isolated and confined environments may also produce positive experiences. A survey of 39 astronauts and cosmonauts found that all of the respondents reported positive changes as a result of flying in space. One particular measure stood out: Perceptions of Earth in general were highly positive, while gaining a stronger appreciation of the Earth's beauty had the highest mean change score.

Since the early 1990s, research began on the salutogenic (or growth-enhancing) aspects of space travel. One study analyzed the published memoirs of 125 space travelers. After returning from space, the subjects reported higher levels on categories of Universalism (i.e., greater appreciation for other people and nature), Spirituality, and Power. Russian space travelers scored higher in Achievement and Universalism and lower in Enjoyment than Americans. Overall, these results suggest that traveling in space is a positive and growth-enhancing experience for many of its individual participants.

== From low Earth orbit to expeditions across the inner Solar System ==
Research to date into human psychological and sociological effects based on on-orbit near-Earth experiences may have limited generalizability to a long-distance, multi-year space expedition, such as a mission to a near-Earth asteroid (which currently is being considered by NASA) or to Mars. In the case of Mars, new stressors will be introduced due to the great distances involved in journeying to the Red Planet. For example, the crew members will be relatively autonomous from terrestrial mission control and will need to plan their work and deal with problems on their own. They are expected to experience significant isolation as the Earth becomes an insignificant bluish-green dot in the heavens, the so-called Earth-out-of-view phenomenon. From the surface of Mars, there will be two-way communication delays with family and friends back home of up to 44 minutes, as well as low-bandwidth communication channels, adding to the sense of isolation.

=== The Mars 500 Program ===
From June 2010 to November 2011, a unique ground-based space analog study took place that was called the Mars 500 Program. Mars 500 was designed to simulate a 520-day round-trip expedition to Mars, including periods of time where the crew functioned under high autonomy conditions and experienced communication delays with outside monitoring personnel in mission control. Six men were confined in a simulator that was located at the Institute for Biomedical Problems in Moscow. The lower floor consisted of living and laboratory modules for the international crew, and the upper floor contained a mock-up of the Mars surface on which the crew conducted simulated geological and other planetary activities.

During a 105-day pilot study in 2009 that preceded this mission, the mood and group interactions of a six-man Russian-European crew, as well as the relationships of this crew with outside mission control personnel, were studied. The study found that high work autonomy (where the crew members planned their own schedules) was well received by the crews, mission goals were accomplished, and there were no adverse effects, which echoed positive autonomy findings in other space analog settings. During the high autonomy period, crew member mood and self-direction were reported as being improved, but mission control personnel reported more anxiety and work role confusion. Despite scoring lower in work pressure overall, the Russian crew members reported a greater rise in work pressure from low to high autonomy than the European participants.

Several psychosocial studies were conducted during the actual 520-day mission. There were changes in crew member time perception, evidence for the displacement of crew tension to mission control, and decreases in crew member needs and requests during high autonomy, which suggested that they had adapted to this condition. The crew exhibited increased homogeneity in values and more reluctance to express negative interpersonal feelings over time, which suggested a tendency toward "groupthink". Additionally, the crew members experienced increased feelings of loneliness and perceived lower support from colleagues over time, which had a negative effect on cognitive adaptation. A number of individual differences in terms of sleep pattern, mood, and conflicts with mission control were found and reported using techniques such as wrist actigraphy, the psychomotor vigilance test, and various subjective measures. A general decrease in group collective time from the outbound phase to the return phase of the simulated flight to Mars was identified. This was accomplished by the evaluation of fixed video recordings of crew behavior during breakfasts through variations in personal actions, visual interactions, and facial expressions.

== Psychosocial and psychiatric issues during an expedition to Mars ==
There are a number of psychosocial and psychiatric issues that may affect crew members during an expeditionary mission to Mars. In terms of selection, only a subset of all astronaut candidates will be willing to be away from family and friends for the two- to three-year mission, so the pool of possible crew members will be restricted and possibly skewed psychologically in ways that cannot be foreseen. Little is known about the physical and psychological effect of long-duration microgravity and the high radiation that occurs in deep space. In addition, on Mars the crew members will be subjected to a gravity field that is only 38 percent of Earth gravity, and the effect of this situation on their physical and emotional well-being is unknown. Given the long distances involved, the crew must function autonomously and develop their own work schedules and solve operational emergencies themselves. They must also be able to deal with medical and psychiatric emergencies, such as physical trauma due to accidents as well as suicidal or psychotic thinking due to stress and depression. Basic life support and staples such as water and fuel will need to be provided from resources on Mars and its atmosphere. There will be a great deal of leisure time (especially during the outbound and return phases of the mission), and occupying it meaningfully and flexibly may be a challenge.

Furthermore, Kanas points out that during on-orbit or lunar missions a number of interventions have been implemented successfully to support crew member psychological well-being. These have included family conferences in real time (i.e., with no appreciable delays), frequent consultations with mission control, and the sending of gifts and favorite foods on resupply ships to enhance morale. Such actions have helped to provide stimulation and counter the effects of isolation, loneliness, asthenization, and limited social contact. But with the delays in crew-ground communication and the inability to send needed resupplies in a timely manner due to the vast distances between the habitats on Mars and Earth, the currently used Earth-based support strategies will be seriously constrained, and new strategies will be needed. Finally, since gazing at the Earth's beauty has been rated as the major positive factor of being in space, the experience of seeing the Earth as an insignificant dot in the heavens may enhance the sense of isolation and produce increased feelings of homesickness, depression and irritability. This may be ameliorated by having a telescope on board with which to view the Earth, thus helping the crew feel more connected with home.

== See also ==
- Space psychology – Psychology applied to spaceflight
- Alcohol and spaceflight – Overview of alcohol within spaceflight
- Central nervous system effects from radiation exposure during spaceflight – Space radiation effects on the brain
- Colonization of Mars
- Effects of sleep deprivation in space
- Fatigue and sleep loss during spaceflight – Sleep in an unusual place
- Mars Analog Habitats – Research simulating the environment on Mars
- Overview effect – Cognitive shift after seeing Earth from space
- Space colonization – Concept of permanent human habitation outside of Earth
- Skylab 4 – Third crewed mission to Skylab
- Team composition and cohesion in spaceflight missions – Psychosocial factors in spaceflight
