= Deana L. Weibel =

American cultural anthropologist

Deana L. Weibel (born 1969) is an American cultural anthropologist and professor at Grand Valley State University. Her research explores intersections of religion, science, and space exploration, as well as pilgrimage and sacred space. She is the author of A Sacred Vertigo: Pilgrimage and Tourism in Rocamadour, France (2022) and has published on topics including astronaut religiosity, sacred symbolism in space, and overlapping interpretations of religious sites. She is a Fellow of The Explorers Club and currently serves as Chair of its Chicago/Great Lakes Chapter.

== Early life and education ==
Weibel attended Santa Ana High School in Santa Ana, California. She earned a B.A. in Linguistics from the University of California, Irvine in 1991, and a Ph.D. in Anthropology from the University of California, San Diego in 2001.

== Career ==
Her doctoral research at the University of California, San Diego focused on religious reinterpretations of a Catholic shrine in Rocamadour, France. She joined Grand Valley State University in 2003 as a faculty member in the Department of Anthropology. Currently, she is a Professor of Anthropology and also holds a joint appointment in the School of Interdisciplinary Studies. From 2012 to 2018, she chaired the Anthropology Department and served as interim chair of the Integrative, Religious, and Intercultural Studies Department in 2021–2022.

Her early research focused on Catholic pilgrimage in France and the United States. She later conducted fieldwork at institutions including the Vatican Observatory and several NASA centers, exploring topics such as space tourism, astronaut spirituality, and ritual practices in space contexts. In 2017, she co-founded Roger That!, an annual interdisciplinary conference on space exploration held in Grand Rapids, Michigan. She is a Fellow of The Explorers Club and currently serves as Chair of its Chicago/Great Lakes Chapter.

== Research and contributions ==
Weibel's early research focused on Catholic pilgrimage sites, particularly Rocamadour in France. Her work examines how a single site can carry overlapping meanings for different populations—for instance, as a Catholic shrine, a historical tourist attraction, or a sacred site associated with Goddess spirituality. Based on this fieldwork, she published A Sacred Vertigo: Pilgrimage and Tourism in Rocamadour, France in 2022. She has also written about religious innovation and the blending of traditions in contemporary spiritual practice.

In 2018, Weibel presented a paper at the American Anthropological Association's annual meeting introducing the term 'ultraview effect' to describe the cognitive response some astronauts report when viewing the deep expanse of space. The concept contrasts with the overview effect, which refers to the psychological impact of seeing Earth from orbit. The concept has since been discussed in public science writing, including a 2023 article in Big Think that featured Weibel’s astronaut interviews and reflections on spiritual responses to space travel and an episode of BBC Radio 4's program Sideways.

Her ethnographic research in 2019 included fieldwork at the Vatican Observatory, multiple NASA research centers, and spaceports across the United States. Weibel's book based on this research is titled The Ultraview Effect: What We Can Learn from Astronauts about Awe, Humility, and Exploring the Unknown, and was released by the University of California Press in May 2026.

Her work on astronaut religiosity, sacred space in orbit, and ethical questions around space tourism has appeared in both academic publications and public-facing outlets, including Erika Nesvold's Off-Earth: Ethical Questions and Quandaries for Living in Outer Space and Diana Walsh Pasulka's Encounters: Experiences with Nonhuman Intelligences. It has also been cited in or featured by media outlets including, The Washington Post, The Wall Street Journal, and the BBC.

In other work, Weibel has written about the history of early anthropology and its intersections with colonialism, including ethnographic displays of the Igorot people at early 20th-century world's fairs and expositions. She has examined these performances both as anthropological artefacts and as part of her own family history, reflecting on her great-grandfather's role as a showman involved in staging "Igorotte Villages."
