= Alcohol and spaceflight =

Overview of alcohol within spaceflight

Alcohol is generally disallowed in spaceflight, but space agencies have previously allowed its consumption. NASA has been stricter about alcohol consumption than Roscosmos, both according to regulations and in practice. Astronauts and cosmonauts are restricted from being intoxicated at launch. Despite restrictions on consumption, there have been experiments in making and keeping alcoholic drinks in space.

The effects of alcohol on human physiology in microgravity have not been researched, though because medications can differ in their effects NASA expects that the effects of alcohol will also differ. Beer and other carbonated drinks are not suitable for spaceflight as the bubbles cause "wet burps"; also, a foamy head cannot form as the bubbles do not rise.

== United States ==
On July 20, 1969, Apollo 11 astronaut Buzz Aldrin drank some wine when he took communion while on the Moon in the Lunar Module Eagle. The ceremony was not broadcast following earlier protests against religious activity that opponents believed to breach the separation between church and state.

In the 1970s, NASA's Charles Bourland planned to send sherry with the astronauts visiting Skylab, but the idea was scrapped because the smell was found to induce a gag reflex in zero-gravity flight tests, there was ambivalence among the astronauts, and angry letters were received after plans were discussed in public by Gerry Carr. Alcohol is prohibited aboard the International Space Station due to the impact it can have on the Environmental Control and Life Support System (ECLSS).

A 1985 NASA report on extended spaceflight predicted that alcohol would be missed, but would only become common in stable settlements.

== Russia ==
The Russian state media Russia Beyond says drinking has been officially banned, but the first alcoholic drink sent into space by cosmonauts was a bottle of cognac, to the Salyut 7 in 1984. Cosmonaut Igor Volk said they would lose weight and hide alcohol in their spacesuits or hide bottles inside book covers, and Georgy Grechko discussed the difficulties of drinking in space as the liquid and air would mix to form froth.

Cosmonauts aboard Mir were allowed alcoholic drinks including cognac, vodka, and "ginseng liqueur", supposedly for health reasons, according to comments made by former cosmonaut Alexander Lazutkin to the Interfax news agency in 2010. Cosmonaut Alexander Poleshchuk said bottles of cognac would be hidden behind panels on Mir. American astronauts on Mir watched while their Russian colleagues drank; NASA tried to block the release of photographs of a 1997 "cognac party" onboard Mir, but James Oberg of NBC News obtained them via a freedom of information request.

In 2006, the ban on cosmonauts drinking on the International Space Station (ISS) was proposed to be lifted, though champagne was still regarded as too dangerous, as the pressurised bottle could have "unpredictable" recoil when opened, or explode while still sealed. Crew care packages cannot contain any alcohol, even in aftershave or mouthwash.

== Pre-flight ==
In July 2007, following a scandal in which astronauts were alleged to have flown while drunk, NASA said that its rules around alcohol were vague and introduced a new rule prohibiting astronauts from being "under the influence" and consuming alcohol within 12 hours of launch, based on the rules for T-38 training jets.

== Alcohol industry ==
A 3D-printed plastic whisky glass was designed for spaceflight in 2015, and whisky was sent to the ISS for four years to study the effect on its flavor. One beer company sponsored a graduate student's research into brewing beer in space, and in 2017 another planned to sponsor research on the ISS with the aim of serving beer on Mars.

Making alcohol in space would be difficult; for example, conventional distillation would be impossible in zero gravity and the volumes of liquid required are high.

== See also ==
- Space food
- Psychological and sociological effects of spaceflight
