= First Conference on Scientific Organization of Labour =

The First Conference on Scientific Organization of Labour was held in Russia in January 1921 to bring together experts in different fields around the study of the problems of human work.

== Background ==
The conference took place in the context of Soviet Russia rebuilding its economy after the war and revolution. The Bolshevik government was very interested in increasing labor productivity and production efficiency to serve the country's industrialization.

Lenin proposed a competition to produce a manual for the Scientific Organization of Labour following Platon Kerzhentsev's publication of "SOL" (Scientific Organization of Labour). Kerzhentsev outlined a three-fold approach:

Subjective approach: Looking at the worker to maximize their efficiency. Objective approach: Focusing on the materials and tools used in the labor process. Integrative approach: Examining how the first two approaches interrelate in a rational method of work organization.

This conference was noted for a number of innovations:

- input-output analysis
- ergology, a fore-runner of ergonomics

== Highlights of the Conference ==
This conference was noted for a number of innovations:

Input-output analysis: This was a new economic approach, applied to analyze the relationships between different industries.

Ergology: The conference discussed the importance of designing workplaces and tools to suit human capabilities and limitations, laying the foundation for the later development of ergonomics.

== Contributions ==
- Vladimir Bekhterev was critical of Taylorism arguing that "The ultimate ideal of the labour problem is not in it, but is in such organisation of the labour process that would yield a maximum of efficiency coupled with a minimum of health hazards, absence of fatigue and a guarantee of the sound health and all round personal development of the working people."
- Alexander Bogdanov has been credited with first posing the input-output model at this conference. His The Organizational Principles of a Uniform Economic Plan describes how the outputs of one enterprise are the inputs to another enterprise. He pointed out that this then creates chains of production which are only as strong as their weakest link. A shortage in any one input will create a limit for the whole chain. Kerzhentsev was to criticise this in an article in Pravda in 1923.
- Vladimir Nikolayevich Myasishchev rejected Frederick Taylor's proposal to turn man into a machine. Dull monotonous work was a temporary necessity until a corresponding machine can be developed.
