= Computer-aided ergonomics =

Computer-aided ergonomics is an engineering discipline using computers to solve complex ergonomic problems involving interaction between the human body and its environment. The human body holds a great complexity thus it can be beneficial to use computers to solve problems involving the human body and the environment that surrounds it.

== Overview ==
Computer-aided ergonomics is an interdisciplinary field of work that involves the use of a computer to solve complex problems regarding a human body interacting with an environment. As the title reveals, having a computer to help find the best ergonomic solution in a given situation. Ergonomics traditionally involves many disciplines including biomechanics, anthropometry, mechanical engineering, industrial engineering, kinesiology, health sciences and physiology. Due to the highly interdisciplinary and complex nature of ergonomics it is hard to get a full understanding of a situation. As the human body is a complex system, thus it is beneficial to have a computer system that models the human body as a mechanical system. The human body contains several parts that can be modeled as known mechanical systems, for example bones connected with joints and driven by actuators (muscles).

== Example of a system ==
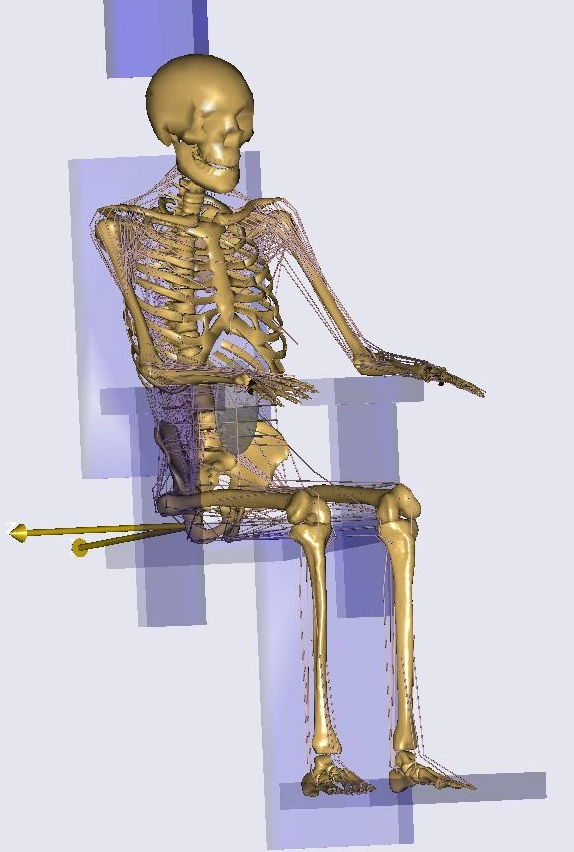
Example of a skeletal mannequin

One example of a computer system that can be used as a computer-aided ergonomics system is The AnyBody Modeling System that consider the human body as a dynamic multi-rigid-body system. The human model is a public domain model contains most of the bones, muscles and joints that are present in the human body. The model has more than 1000 muscle elements, and many muscle elements have been modeled with detailed muscle model theory described by Hill, A.V. in 1938. The muscle model contains information including physiological cross-sectional area, length, ratio of red and white fibers. The AnyBody modeling system is capable of modeling almost any human voluntary movement or static situation. One example of a model, could be a seated model, where the human body is placed in a chair, that have a seat, backrest, headrest, leg rest, footrest, and armrest. The model can then calculate the forces acting between the human body and the chair, as well as for example the forces between any given spinal vertebra. This could be used for finding the optimal seated posture for a person, who has lower back pain, assuming that greater load on a vertebra result in greater pain.

== Benefits of computer-aided ergonomics ==
The question is "In what scenario" it would be beneficial to use computer-aided ergonomics compared to traditional ergonomics. First, computer aided ergonomics using, for example, a musculo-skeletal modeling system as The AnyBody Modeling system, would be beneficial in physical ergonomics, which traditional combines aspects from the human anatomical, anthropometric, physiological and biomechanical characteristics related to some physical activity. The model can provide a quantitative foundation for ergonomic design and recommendations.

Traditionally "Ergonomics" has been based on recommendations derived from empirical data from various working tasks; if many people get injured from working in a certain posture, it is recommended to avoid working in that posture. However, when applying the recommendations to another related working posture, the posture or the movement often does not match exactly. This means that the theory and recommendations does not apply to the new situation. In this case it could be beneficial to model the situation in order to find out how the reaction forces and muscle activities differ from the first situation, where the recommendations were based on empirical data.

A combination of risk factors can be derived from the model output. For example, when designing an office chair, one would like to design it to fulfill several demands; comfortable, relaxing, supporting and so on. Some of the criteria related to the demands might be conflicting for example; comfort is often related to the shear force on the seat, which should be kept as low as possible. The seat shear force could be removed by making a horizontal seat and rising the backrest to 90 degrees however this would not be relaxing. Therefore, a combination of seat and backrest angles needs to be considered in order to find optimal seated postures related to only the two design variables.

Computer-aided ergonomics is an interdisciplinary field of work, that involve the use of a computer to solve complex problems that involve a person interacting with an environment. As the title reveals, it is all about having a computer to help finding the best ergonomic solution. Ergonomics involves many disciplines, such as biomechanics, anthropometry, mechanical engineering, industrial engineering, kinesiology, health sciences and physiology. Due to the highly interdisciplinary it is hard to get a full understanding of a situation based on knowledge, unless the knowledge in some way is built into a computer system.
