= Astronaut organization in spaceflight missions =

Psychosocial factors in spaceflight

Selection, training, cohesion and psychosocial adaptation influence performance and, as such, are relevant factors to consider while preparing for costly, long-duration spaceflight missions in which the performance objectives will be demanding, endurance will be tested and success will be critical.

During the selection of crew members, throughout their training and during their psychosocial adaptation to the mission environment, there are several opportunities to encourage optimal performance and, in turn, minimize the risk of failure.

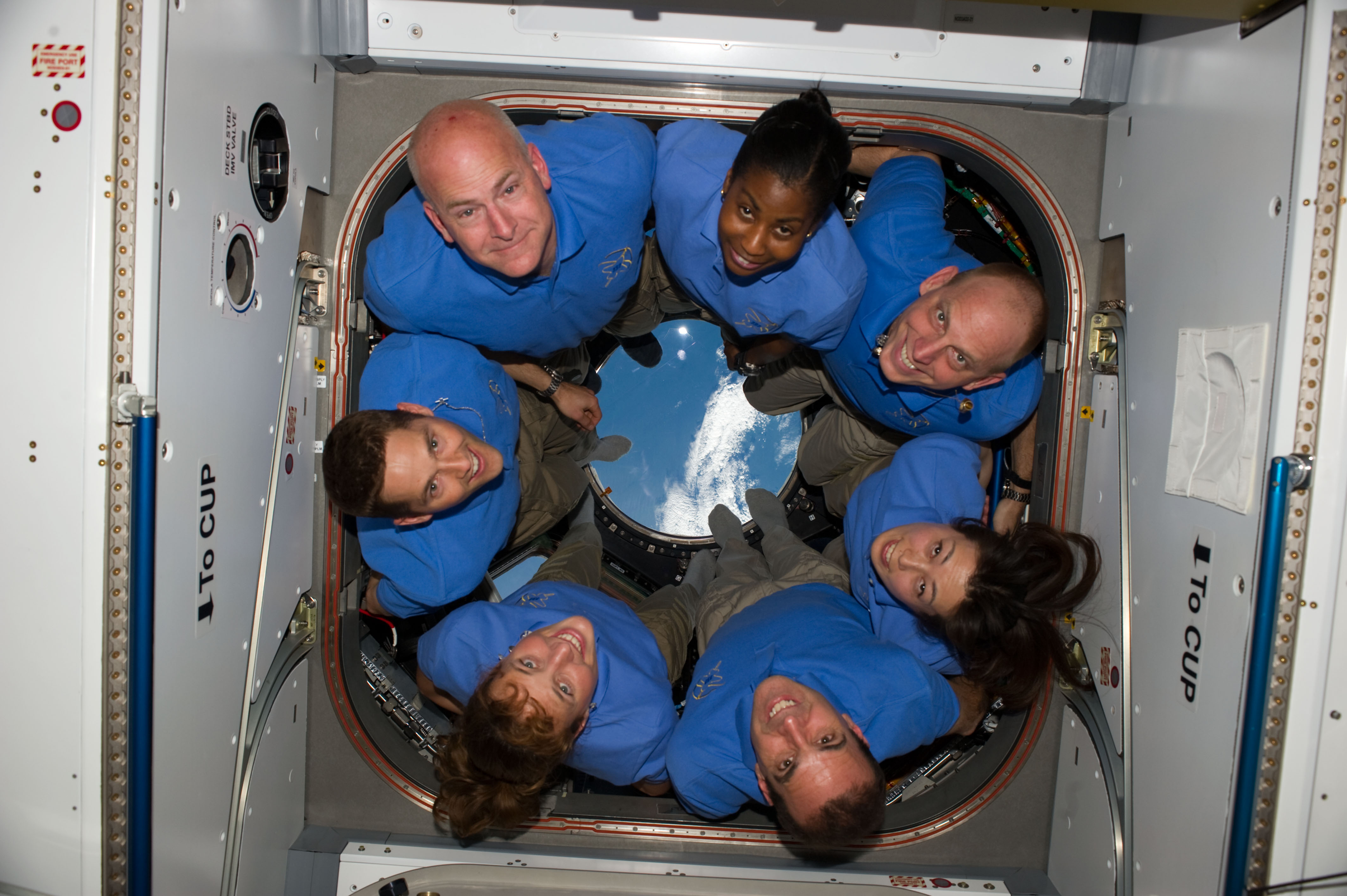
The STS-131 crew members pose for a portrait in the Cupola of the International Space Station while Space Shuttle Discovery remains docked with the station. Pictured counter-clockwise (from top left) are NASA astronauts Alan Poindexter, commander; James P. Dutton Jr., pilot; Dorothy Metcalf-Lindenburger, Rick Mastracchio, Japan Aerospace Exploration Agency (JAXA) astronaut Naoko Yamazaki, NASA astronauts Clayton Anderson and Stephanie Wilson, all mission specialists.

== Individual selection and crew composition ==
Evidence linking crew selection, composition, training, cohesion or psychosocial adaptation to performance errors is uncertain. Many NASA-backed studies regarding spaceflight, as well as space analogs, emphasize the need to consider these factors. The research on performance errors caused by team factors is ambiguous and currently, no systematic attempt has been undertaken to measure performance errors due to psychosocial team factors during space flight.

As a result, evidence does not help identify what is needed to reduce the risk of performance errors in space. Ground-based evidence demonstrates that decrements in individual and team performance are related to the psychosocial characteristics of teamwork. Also, there are reasons to believe that ground support personnel and crew members experience many of the same basic issues regarding teamwork and performance.

The study of performance errors implies that human actions may be simplified into a dichotomy of "correct" or "incorrect" responses. It has been argued that this dichotomy is a harmful oversimplification, and that it would be more productive to focus on the variability of human performance and how organizations can manage that variability. There are two particular problems that occur when focusing on performance errors:

- errors are infrequent and therefore, are difficult to observe and record
- the errors do not correspond to failure

Research shows that humans are fairly adept at correcting or compensating for performance errors before such errors result in recognizable or recordable failures. Most failures are recorded only when multiple errors occur and are not preventable.

=== Selection ===
For NASA's purposes, a team is commonly understood to be a collection of individuals that is assigned to support and achieve a particular mission. One way of selecting for teams is to identify those individuals who are best suited to work in teams, ensuring that each individual team member possesses the qualities and skills that lend themselves to optimal teamwork. Many organizations use competency frameworks to select individuals utilizing a "team-working" competency that measures how an individual works with other team members (support, knowledge sharing, etc.). These "teamwork" competencies have been shown to help predict individual performance in teams.

Efforts have been made within spaceflight operations to identify factors that are important for selecting individual crew members for long duration spaceflight. There has also been an analytical study to identify the skills necessary for long and short duration missions to inform the initial astronaut candidate selection process. In this study, twenty experts (including astronauts) rated 47 relevant skills on criticality and another 42 environmental and work demands on their probability of occurrence.

This resulted in 10 broad factors that were deemed important for long-duration missions:

- performance under stressful conditions
- mental/emotional stability
- judgement/decision making
- teamwork skills
- conscientiousness
- family issues
- group living skills
- motivation
- communication skills
- leadership capabilities

These factors somewhat overlap with those identified in previous peer-rating studies which suggest both a job competence and an interpersonal dimension for astronaut performance.

There is a lack of data that related performance to team composition and cohesion due to the evolution of job duties and selection practices over the history of crewed spaceflight as well as the limited number of astronauts actually selected (340 U.S. astronauts to date). These issues are relevant to other space agencies as well. In 1990, a European astronaut working group reevaluated selection criteria for the selection of European astronauts as Russian researchers have collected personality data on cosmonauts for a number of years. The empirical linking of personality factors to specific performance levels still eludes researchers.

Table 2-1. Summary of Findings Presented for Selection
| Source | Predictor | Outcome | Context | Evidence Type |
|---|---|---|---|---|
| Sandal, 1999 | Teamwork competencies | Improved individual performance in teams | Space flight | Category III |
| McFadden et al., 1994 | Teamwork competencies | Improved individual performance in teams | Ground-based | Category III |
| Jones et al., 2000 | Factors: Skilled at training and articulating their roles to others, at compromising, and at helping other team members as well as understanding effective team processes | Higher team performance | Ground-based | Category III |
| Bell, 2007 | Average team general mental ability | Higher team performance | Ground-based | Category I |
| Bell, 2007 | Big Five personality factors | Higher team performance | Ground-based | Category I |
| Barrick et al., 1998 | Team average general mental ability, and extroversion and emotional stability | Higher team effectiveness | Ground-based | Category II |
| Chidester et al., 1991 | "Right stuff" personality cluster | Increased teamwork ability | Ground-based | Category II |
| Stuster, 1996 | Personality characteristics (e.g., social compatibility, emotional control, patience, etc.) | Increased teamwork ability | Analog | Category III |

=== Composition ===
Table 2-2. Summary of Findings Presented for Crew Composition
| Source | Predictor | Outcome | Context | Evidence Type |
|---|---|---|---|---|
| Allen and West, 2005 | Lack of members low in agreeableness or extroversion | Higher-performing teams | Ground-based | Category II |
| Barry and Stewart, 1997 | High proportion of members who were extroverted | Higher-performing teams | Ground-based | Category II |
| Harrison et al., 1998; McGrath, 1984 | Deep-level similarity | Increased team cohesion | Ground-based | Category II |
| Edwards et al., 2006 | Deep-level similarity | Higher long-term performance | Ground-based | Category II |
| Schmidt et al., 2004 | Perceptions of Leadership effectiveness | Improved general satisfaction of team with work, performance, and each other | Ground-based | Category III |

== Influences on team performance ==
=== Positive influences on team performances ===
- Select individuals who are more capable of performing well in a team
- Different team compositions better facilitate different types of performance
- Training individual team skills and training teams together encourages better individual and team performance
- Teams that are more cohesive demonstrate better performance than less cohesive teams
- Better teamwork increases the likelihood of recovery and survival in the event of a malfunction or error
- Members of more cohesive teams demonstrate better individual performance and report more physical and psychological resilience under duress
- Individuals and teams perform better and maintain high performance and good health longer when they adapt more quickly and effectively to the stressors that are inherent in a psychosocial environment
- Psychosocial factors that influence teamwork and performance in traditional work environments appear in the space exploration work environment

=== Negative influences on team performances ===
- Negative consequences (e.g., incomplete objectives, lost time) that are related to interpersonal stressors such as isolation, confinement, danger, monotony, inappropriate workload, lack of control group composition-related tensions, personality conflicts, and leadership issues have been observed on previous long-duration missions
- Interpersonal stressors, which are cumulative over time, pose a greater threat to performance and team success as work duration increases

== Training ==
Long-duration space flights are so physically, mentally and emotionally demanding that simply selecting individual crew members who have the "right stuff" is insufficient. Training and supporting optimal performance is more effective than simply selecting high performers. Training team skills and supporting optimal performance entails more than educating astronauts about the technical aspects of the job, it also requires equipping those astronauts with the resources that are needed to maintain psychological and physical health during long-duration spaceflight missions.

Developing the right kind of training for team skills is further complicated by operational issues. Not all tasks that will or may be encountered can be anticipated. Unexpected tasks can, and have, arise suddenly. Team training needs to be broad and flexible enough to support these unexpected performance requirements.

== Cohesion ==
Group cohesiveness has been defined as the strength of members' motivations to stay in the group. Leon Festinger cited three primary characteristics that define team cohesion: interpersonal attraction, task commitment and group pride. Studies to determine the strength or willingness of individuals to stick together and act as a unit have most consistently assessed the level of conflict, degree of interpersonal tensions, facility and quality of communications, collective perceptions of team health and performance of the group, and the extent to which team members share perceptions or understandings concerning their operational context.

Researchers at the U.S. Army Research Institute (ARI) noted in their recent review of cohesion as a construct, that the definitions of cohesion is ambiguous; therefore, the means of measuring cohesion is complex. The ARI authors concluded that "cohesion can best be conceptualized as a multidimensional construct consisting of numerous factors representing interpersonal and task dynamics. There is a large body of ground-based evidence showing cohesion influences levels of performance, but this evidence is primarily correlational rather than causal.

Cohesive teams are more productive than less cohesive teams. This situation could be because

- more productive teams become more cohesive,

or

- more cohesive teams become more productive.

Teams preserve their cohesion when they succeed rather than fail. Therefore, applied scientists advise it is important to promote three essential conditions for team performance:

- ability (knowledge and skills) - Team members need to have sufficient levels of interpersonal and technical skills to perform their jobs and to attain team objectives.
- motivation - Team members must also be motivated to use their knowledge and skills to achieve shared goals.
- coordination strategy - Team context (organizational context, team design, and team culture) must create conditions to avoid problems such as social loafing, free riding, or diffusion of responsibility.

These kinds of problems undermine team performance and can have detrimental effects on team cohesion (Thompson, 2002).

Research shows that cohesive teams tend to sit closer to each other, focus more attention on each other, show signs of mutual affection, display coordinated patterns of behavior as well as give due credit to their partners. Non-cohesive teams are more likely to take credit for successes and blame others for mistakes and failures. It is important to differentiate between team cohesiveness and individual morale. An individual who has low morale can influence team cohesion, but it may be possible for a team to remain cohesive even with low-morale members.

Table 2-3. Summary of Findings Presented for Team Skills Training
| Source | Predictor | Outcome | Context | Evidence Type |
|---|---|---|---|---|
| Guzzo et al., 1985 | Training | Increasing motivation and individual performance | Ground-based | Category II |
| Guzzo et al., 1985 | Goal-setting | Increasing motivation and individual performance | Ground-based | Category II |
| Arthur et al., 2003 | Cognitive skills training | Improved job performance | Ground-based | Category II |
| Arthur et al., 2003 | Interpersonal skills training | Improved job performance | Ground-based | Category II |
| Bradley et al., 2003 | Interpersonal skills training (includes goal setting, group problem solving, team coordination, etc.) | Good supervisor ratings of team performance | Ground-based | Category II |
| Baker et al., 2006 | Teamwork training skills | Improved surgical team performance and reduced errors | Ground-based | Category II |
| Powell and Hill, 2006 | Teamwork and psychosocial skills training | Reductions in adverse patient outcomes, errors, etc. | Ground-based | Category III |
| Burke et al., 2006 | Teamwork skills training | More adaptive teams | Ground-based | Category III |
| Marks et al. 2000 | Communication and interaction skills training | Improved team performance | Lab study | Category I |
| Smith-Jentsch et al., 1996 | Team skills training | Improved team performance | Lab study | Category I |
| Morgeson and DeRue, 2006 | Knowledge about teamwork | Improved team performance | Ground-based | Category II |
| Espevik et al., 2006 | Knowledge about team members | Improved team performance | Ground-based | Category II |
| Edwards et al., 2006 | Time spent working and training as a team | Increased team contribution | Ground-based | Category III |
| Rasmussen and Jeppesen, 2006 | Time spent training together as a team | Few conflicts and conflict-related performance deficiencies | Ground-based | Category II |
| Balkundi and Harrison, 2006 | Teams with densely configured interpersonal ties | More committed to achieving performance goals | Ground-based | Category II |
| Espinosa et al., 2007 | Teams with experience working together | Higher performance | Ground-based | Category II |

Psychosocial experts within the spaceflight community have articulated their concern that interpersonal conflicts and lack of cohesion will impede the abilities of crews to perform tasks accurately, efficiently, or in a coordinated manner during long-duration missions.

From the evidence, it cannot be said that lack of team cohesion is statistically likely to result in numerous performance errors or an observable failure, but it does seem likely that ignoring the relationship between cohesion and performance will result in sub-optimal performance. We know that many factors contribute to how cohesion is built and encouraged within a team, and we know that cohesion is positively related to better performance. Research cannot effectively determine in a reasonable amount of time what minimum level of cohesion is required to avoid catastrophic failure. Instead of investing research and time in such an endeavor, funding would be better used to test and identify effective means of building cohesion and promoting optimal performance in a long-duration mission context.

Although the astronaut candidate selection process screens for individuals with personality or mood disorders, certain disorders (i.e. poor psychosocial adaptation) may develop due to poor cohesion and/or support is a concern that could ultimately decrease performance in space flight crews.

Although spaceflight evidence regarding cohesion and performance is limited by the scarcity of objective team performance data, case studies, interviews and surveys have been conducted within the spaceflight community that have provided evidence that issues pertaining to cohesion exist and are perceived as threats to effective operations. For example, breakdowns in team coordination, resource and informational exchanges, and role conflicts (all common indicators of poor team cohesion) were mentioned as contributors to both the Challenger and the Columbia space shuttle accidents. Likewise, interviews and surveys of flight controllers indicate that mission teams are commonly concerned with team member coordination and communications, and that interpersonal conflicts and tensions do exist.

Because of a lack of empirical evidence from spaceflight research, much of the evidence surrounding cohesion and performance comes from non-space domains such as aviation, medicine, the military, and space analogs. Some reports have estimated that "crew error" in aviation contributes 65% to 70% of all serious accidents. The resulting accident investigations and mishap reports note poor teamwork, communication, coordination, and tactical decision-making as significant causal factors in mishap samples and team breakdowns are repeatedly implicated in accidents. Interpersonal conflicts, miscommunications, failures to communicate, and poor teamwork skills have been shown to contribute significantly to the rate of errors in the medical field.

Meta-analyses conducted in various industries and types of performance teams (work, military, sport, educational, etc.) provide additional ground-based evidence that cohesion is related to performance. The authors of these meta-analyses (Evans and Dion) found a positive correlation between cohesion and individual performance, but did not include group performance criterion measures. Mullen and Copper found that cohesion positively affects performance. They also found that this relationship was stronger in real teams verses ad hoc teams, in small teams verses large teams as well as in field studies. Mullen and Copper also noted that successful performance also promotes cohesion and numerous performance outcomes including individual and group performance, behavioral health, job satisfaction, readiness to perform, and absence of discipline problems.

In the later meta-analyses, it was found that as work required more collaboration, the cohesion-performance relationship became stronger and highly cohesive teams became more likely to perform better than less-cohesive teams. This conclusion coincides with Thompson's cumulated field study finding that cohesion facilitates team processes and team coordination among work teams in various industrial settings.

Table 2-4. Summary of Findings Presented for Cohesion
| Source | Predictor | Outcome | Context | Evidence Type |
|---|---|---|---|---|
| Thompson, 2002 | Cohesive team | Give due credit to members of team | Ground-based | Category II |
| Hackman, 1996 | Lack of cohesion | Poor performance | Ground-based | Category IV |
| Merket and Bergondy, 2000 | Lack of cohesion (team breakdowns) | Increased accident frequency | Ground-based | Category III |
| Baker et al., 2006 | Lack of cohesion (interpersonal conflict, miscommunication, etc.) | Increased medical error | Ground-based | Category III |
| Mullen and Cooper, 1994 | High cohesion (stronger for real teams) | Increased performance | Ground-based | Category I |
| Oliver et al., 2000 | High cohesion | High individual and group performance, behavioral health, and job satisfaction | Ground-based | Category I |
| Thompson, 2002 | High cohesion | Increased team coordination | Ground-based | Category III |
| Ahronson and Cameron, 2007 | High interpersonal cohesion | Decreased psychological distress | Ground-based | Category II |
| Edwards et al., 2006 | Shared mental models (SMMs) | Increased productivity | Ground-based | Category II and Category III |
| Bowers et al., 2002; Driskell et al., 1999 | Implicit coordination strategies | More effective teams (more cohesive) | Ground-based | Category I and Category II |

A significant positive relationship between performance and the generalized beliefs of team members concerning the capabilities of their team across different situations. Although most research on team cohesion and performance concentrate on the positive aspects of team attitudes, some have investigated the level of conflict and negative attitudes concerning the team as indicators of cohesion. De Dreu and Weingart noted an important distinction between interpersonal conflict and task conflict (defined, interpersonal conflicts are about relationship issues, whereas task conflicts are about how to handle tasks).

Interpersonal conflict is generally detrimental to team cohesion, and, in turn, is destructive to team performance. While team members may correct each other, offer alternatives and argue about how to solve a problem, some level of task-related conflict can promote optimal performance. In contrast, interpersonal and task-related aspects of cohesion are generally found to influence performance positively. A study conducted with Canadian military groups showed that task-related cohesion was positively related to individual job satisfaction, interpersonal cohesion was negatively related to reports of psychological distress, and both types of cohesion were positively related to job performance.

Research conducted on Antarctic space analogs investigated conflict, cohesion and performance. It was found that:

- Inter-member hostility was related to the poor ratings of member effectiveness
- Team members' perceptions of status contributed to conflicts and reduced perceptions of cohesion
- Positive team climate and cohesion helped to reduce interpersonal tensions, contributing to work satisfaction

This last point was studied over a ten-year period, modeling individual and group effects on adaptation to life in an extreme environment using multilevel analysis (Category III).

The military and aviation industries have focused more on task cohesion and shared mental models (SMMs) in their cohesion studies. SMMs refer to implicit agreements in team member expectations concerning how things work and what behaviors will result in various conditions and were proposed to characterize cohesive work teams. Studies that compare performance during simulated operations and training note that

- Members of high-performing teams coordinate with one another frequently to establish, maintain and adapt SMMs as the situation evolves.
- Teams that have little to no training on developing or coordinating SMMs demonstrate more errors and are less productive as compared to teams that have received training on building SMMs

=== Leadership and cohesion ===
Leadership, or the ability to influence others toward achieving group goals, may also play a role in team cohesion. Although there is an abundance of research that exists for this topic, much of it is complex and conflicting and the findings are often mixed. Many studies are at the individual level and may not generalize to the spaceflight setting. Studies have shown a supporting relationship between different types of leadership styles, individual performance and morale.

== Additional information ==
- Psychological and sociological issues affecting space travel

== See also ==
- Skylab 4
