= Iranian Journal of Public Health =

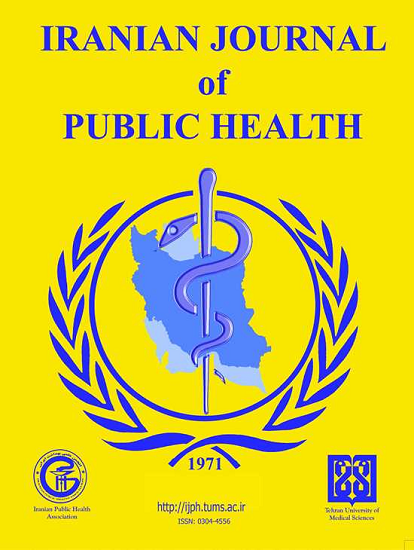
- Discipline: Public health
- Language: English
- Edited by: Dariush D. Farhud

Publication details
- History: 1971–present
- Publisher: Tehran University of Medical Sciences (Iran)
- Frequency: Monthly
- Open access: Yes
- Impact factor: 1.291 (2019)

Standard abbreviations
- ISO 4: Iran. J. Public Health

Indexing
- CODEN: IJPHCD
- ISSN: 2251-6085 (print); 2251-6093 (web)
- LCCN: 2006312620
- OCLC no.: 909884434

Links
- Journal homepage; Online access; Online archive

The Iranian Journal of Public Health is a monthly peer-reviewed open-access medical journal covering all aspects of public health. It is published by the Tehran University of Medical Sciences and was established in 1971 by Dariush Farhud.

== Indexing and abstracting ==
The journal is abstracted and indexed in the following bibliographic databases:

- CAB Abstracts
- CINAHL
- Embase
- Islamic World Science Citation Database
- Science Citation Index Expanded
- Scopus
- Social Sciences Citation Index

According to the Journal Citation Reports, the journal has a 2019 impact factor of 1.291.
