= Overview effect =

Cognitive shift after seeing Earth from space

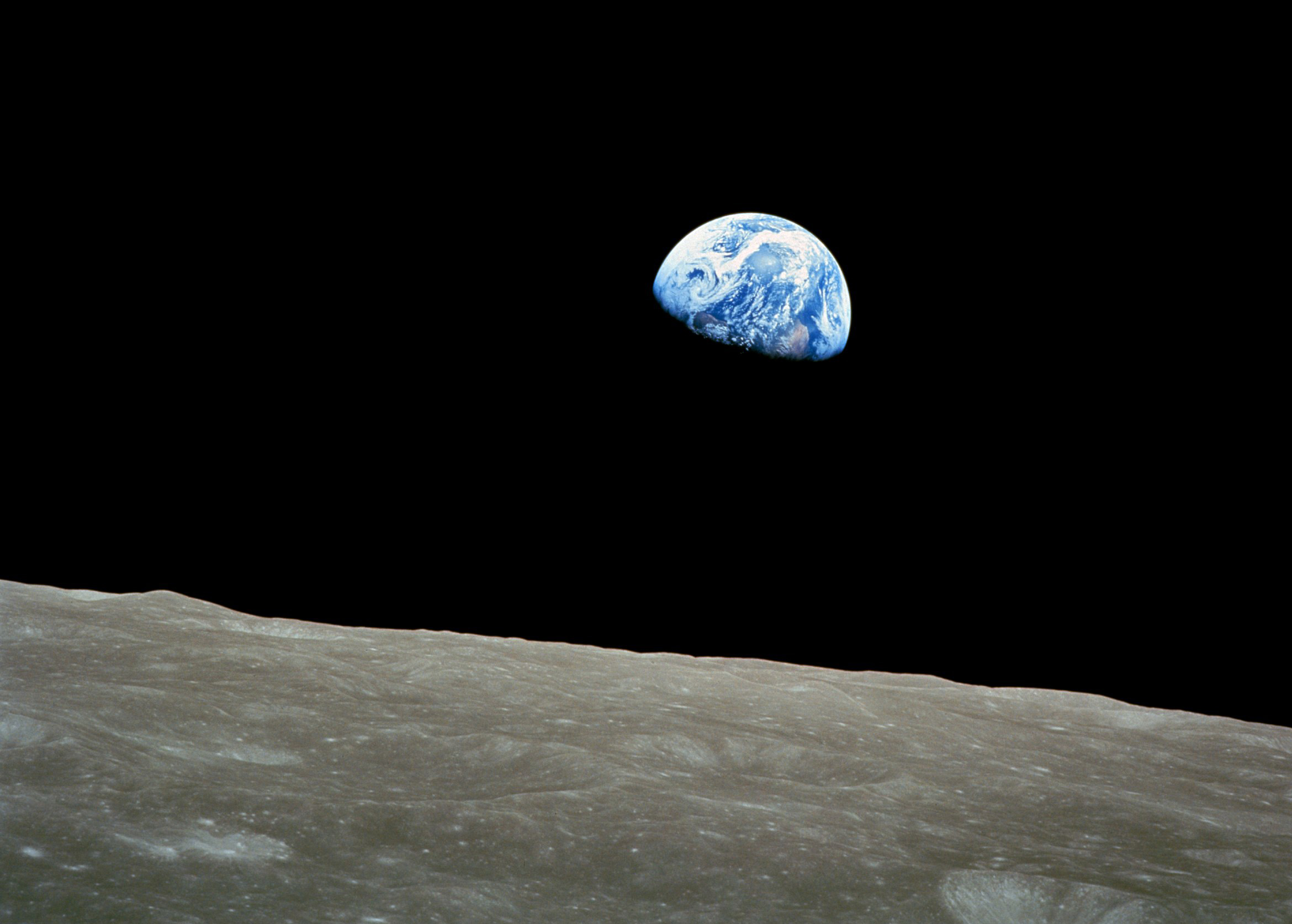
Earthrise (1968). Apollo 8 astronaut Bill Anders recalled, "When I looked up and saw the Earth coming up on this very stark, beat-up Moon horizon, I was immediately almost overcome with the thought, 'Here we came all this way to the Moon, and yet the most significant thing we're seeing is our own home planet, the Earth.'"

The overview effect is a cognitive shift (Note: The introduction to Stepanova et al. (2019) begins, "The overwhelmingly beautiful sight of our Earth triggers a profound emotional response in most astronauts, leading to a cognitive shift, making them realize the global interconnectedness of all life and feel responsibility for the future of our planet. ... This experience has the attributes of self-transcendence and awe (citing Yaden et al., 2016) and is a remarkable example of a transformative experience.) reported by some astronauts while viewing the Earth from space. Researchers have characterized the effect as "a state of awe with self-transcendent qualities, precipitated by a particularly striking visual stimulus". The most prominent common aspects of personally experiencing the Earth from space are appreciation and perception of beauty, unexpected and even overwhelming emotion, and an increased sense of connection to other people and the Earth as a whole. The effect can cause changes in the observer's self concept and value system, and can be transformative. Immersive virtual reality simulations have been designed to try to induce the overview effect in earthbound participants.

== Characteristics ==
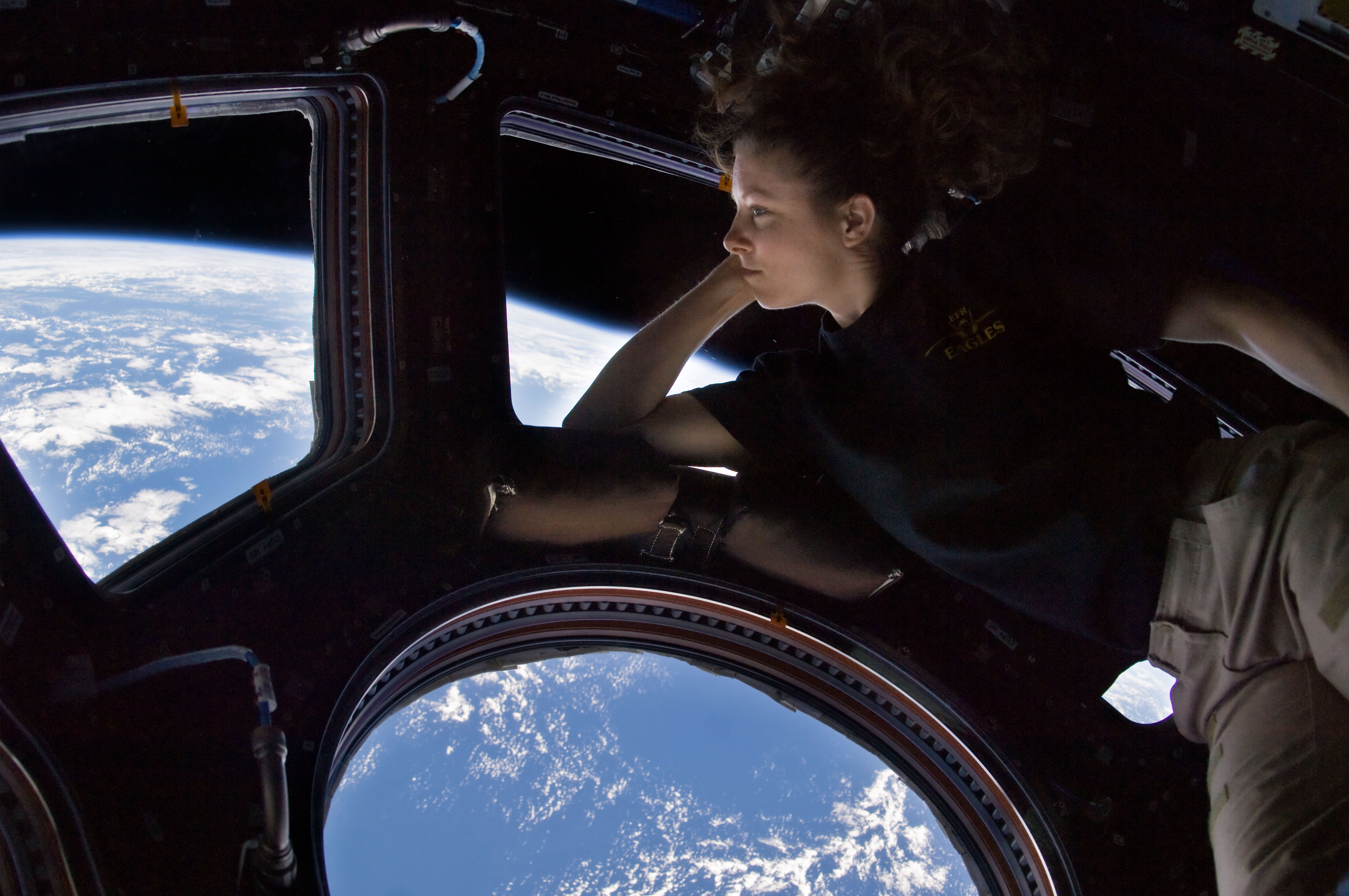
Astronaut Tracy Caldwell Dyson "Earth gazing" in the Cupola module of the International Space Station, a practice found to have positive psychological effects, one that is especially important in coping with the demands of spaceflight

Broadly, Yaden et al. (2016) state that the most prominent common aspects of the astronauts' experience were appreciation and perception of beauty, unexpected and even overwhelming emotion, and an increased sense of connection to other people and the Earth as a whole. Yaden et al. proposed that the overview effect can be understood in terms of awe (Note: Yaden et al. (2016) explain that "social psychologists characterize awe as an intense emotion resulting from the perception of something vast, as well as the subsequent need to accommodate the experience" (citing Keltner & Haidt, 2003). However, they observe that in addition to vastness, a distant view of Earth also suggests totality—with the wholeness of the Earth making it a symbol of almost all that is meaningful in human life, causing a tendency to think, quite literally, in global terms.) and self-transcendence, (Note: Yaden et al. (2016) posit that the overview effect may trigger self-transcendent experiences (STEs)—"temporary feelings of unity characterized by reduced self-salience and increased feelings of connection" historically associated with practices such as prayer, meditation, religious rituals and psychedelic drug use—feelings that may "arouse visceral feelings of compassion and personal connection... that may encompass the entirety of the Earth and its inhabitants".) which they describe as "among the deepest and most powerful aspects of the human experience". More specifically, they write that the effect might best be understood as "a state of awe with self-transcendent qualities, precipitated by a particularly striking visual stimulus". Yaden posited that the overview effect triggers awe through both perceptual vastness (like seeing the Grand Canyon) and conceptual vastness (like contemplating big ideas like infinity).

Yaden et al. (2016) write that some astronauts viewing Earth from space "report overwhelming emotion and feelings of identification with humankind and the planet as a whole". The effect can cause changes in the observer's self concept and value system, and is sometimes transformative. Voski (2020) demonstrated a marked influence on astronauts' environmental attitudes and behaviors, and a new level of environmental awareness and consciousness. Though astronaut Leland Melvin said the effect seems to take hold of astronauts regardless of culture or nation of origin, Yaden et al. observed that cultural differences, including differences in religious and social identity, affect the ways in which the effect is experienced and interpreted. Expressions range from the religious, to the "vaguely spiritual", to the naturalistic, to calls to social duty.

Author Frank White, who in the 1980s coined the term overview effect after interviewing many astronauts, said that the overview effect is "beyond words", requiring experience to understand, even likening it in this regard to Zen Buddhism. He said that astronauts' very first views of the planet were generally very significant, adding that some experience the effect "in a moment" while in others it grows over time; and generally that the effect "does accumulate".

Not all astronauts experience the overview effect. Further, White distinguished experiences in low Earth orbit where the planet takes up most of an astronaut's view, from experiences on the Moon in which one sees the whole Earth "against a backdrop of the entire cosmos". He described a "big difference" between professional astronauts, who are focused on their missions—versus people who have recently been going into space "with an intention to have an experience" and who may already be aware of the overview effect.

=== Alternative characterizations ===
Beginning in the 2010s, science historian Jordan Bimm argued against White's interpretation that the overview effect is, in Bimm's words, "a reliably produced mental effect—a naturally occurring phenomenon between the environment and the human mind". Instead, Bimm asserts that the effect is "both a natural and cultural object" that is variable over particular individuals, divergent cultures, and different time periods. Preliminarily, Bimm noted that studies of early test pilots' negative-experience break-off phenomenon ended in 1973 (displaced by White's "positive conversion narrative"), that astronauts in a "lie to fly" culture feel career pressure to avoid reporting negative psychological reactions, and that individuals already aware of the overview effect may make it a self-fulfilling prophecy. He posited that it was Cold War and mastery-of-Earth mentalities of Western technological supremacy that contributed to the rise of borderless-world concepts such as the Gaia hypothesis, spaceship Earth, and the Blue Marble.

Bimm expressed concern over White's perception that the effect embodies a natural imperative for humans to pursue space travel and colonization, Bimm saying the attitude resembles the 18th-century American colonialist, expansionist concept of manifest destiny. Bimm warned of hubris underlying a perception of having achieved a new level of enlightenment that he called the "overlord effect".

== History ==
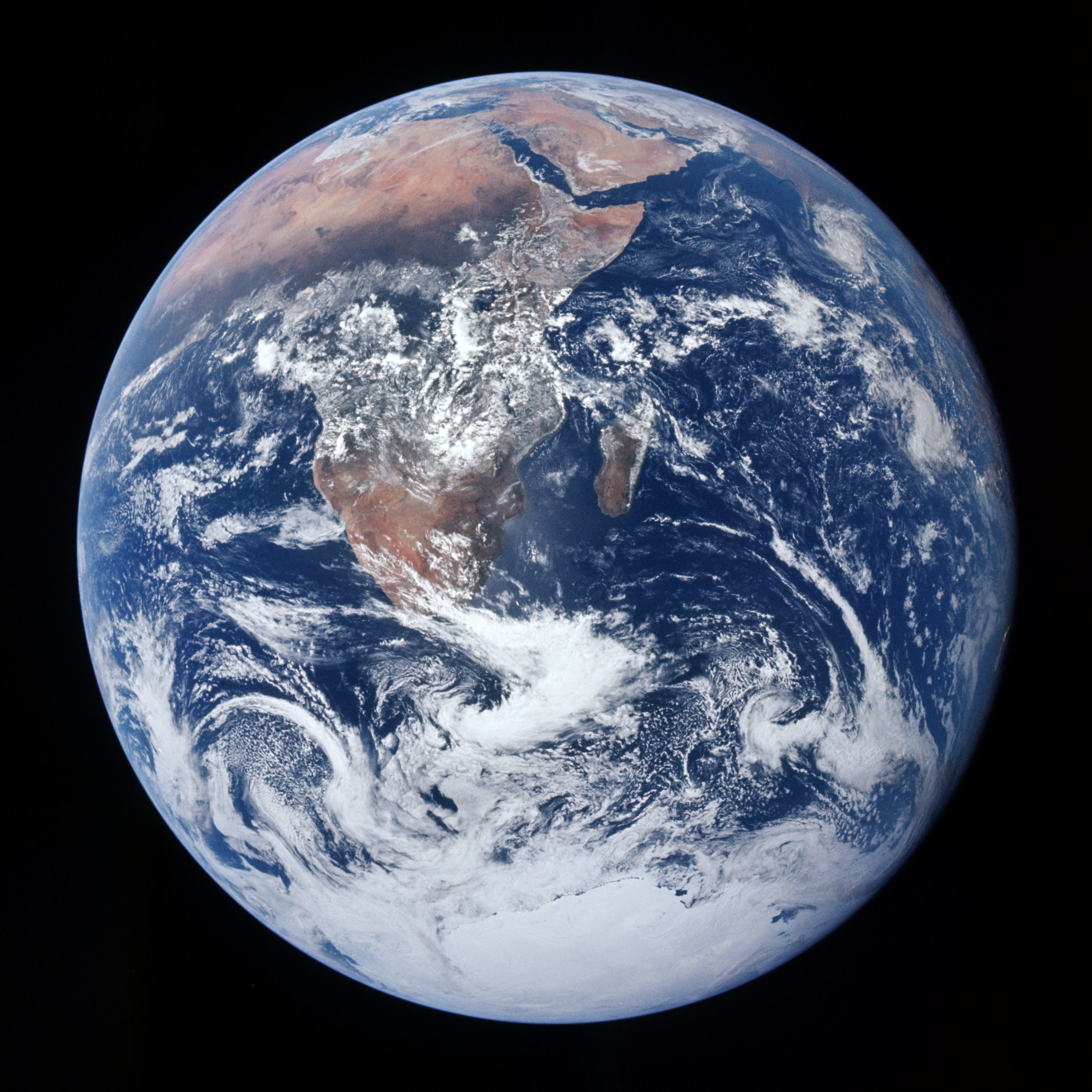
The Blue Marble—Earth as seen by the crew of Apollo 17 in 1972. Early photos of Earth taken from space inspired a mild version of the overview effect in earthbound non-astronauts, and became prominent symbols of environmental concern.

English astronomer Fred Hoyle wrote in 1948 that, "once a photograph of the Earth, taken from the outside, is available, a new idea as powerful as any in history will be let loose". After Apollo 8 astronaut William Anders' December 1968 Earthrise photograph of the Earth from lunar orbit, the Apollo missions were credited with inspiring the environmental movement, the first Earth Day being held in April 1970. Hoyle said that people suddenly seemed to care about protecting Earth's natural environment, though others attribute that awareness to Rachel Carson's 1962 book Silent Spring and reactions to several environmental disasters in the 1960s.

The term overview effect was coined by author and researcher Frank White, who said he thought he first had "a mild experience" of the effect while flying across the country and looking out the aircraft's window. That experience led him to imagine living in an O'Neill cylinder (habitat in space), which inspired him to become involved with the Space Studies Institute and begin speaking with astronauts.

White's astronaut interviews confirmed the importance of the difference between intellectual knowledge versus experience, of perceiving the "striking thinness of the atmosphere", of thinking of ourselves interconnected and part of the Earth as an organic system, and that we as different people "are all in this together". The first public use of the term was in a poster at a Space Studies Institute meeting in 1985. Eventually, White wrote about the effect in his book The Overview Effect — Space Exploration and Human Evolution (1987), which has a fourth edition (2021). White's work did not attain broad influence until the 2010s—a period of increased societal divisions and a new prospect of private space travel.

== Accounts ==
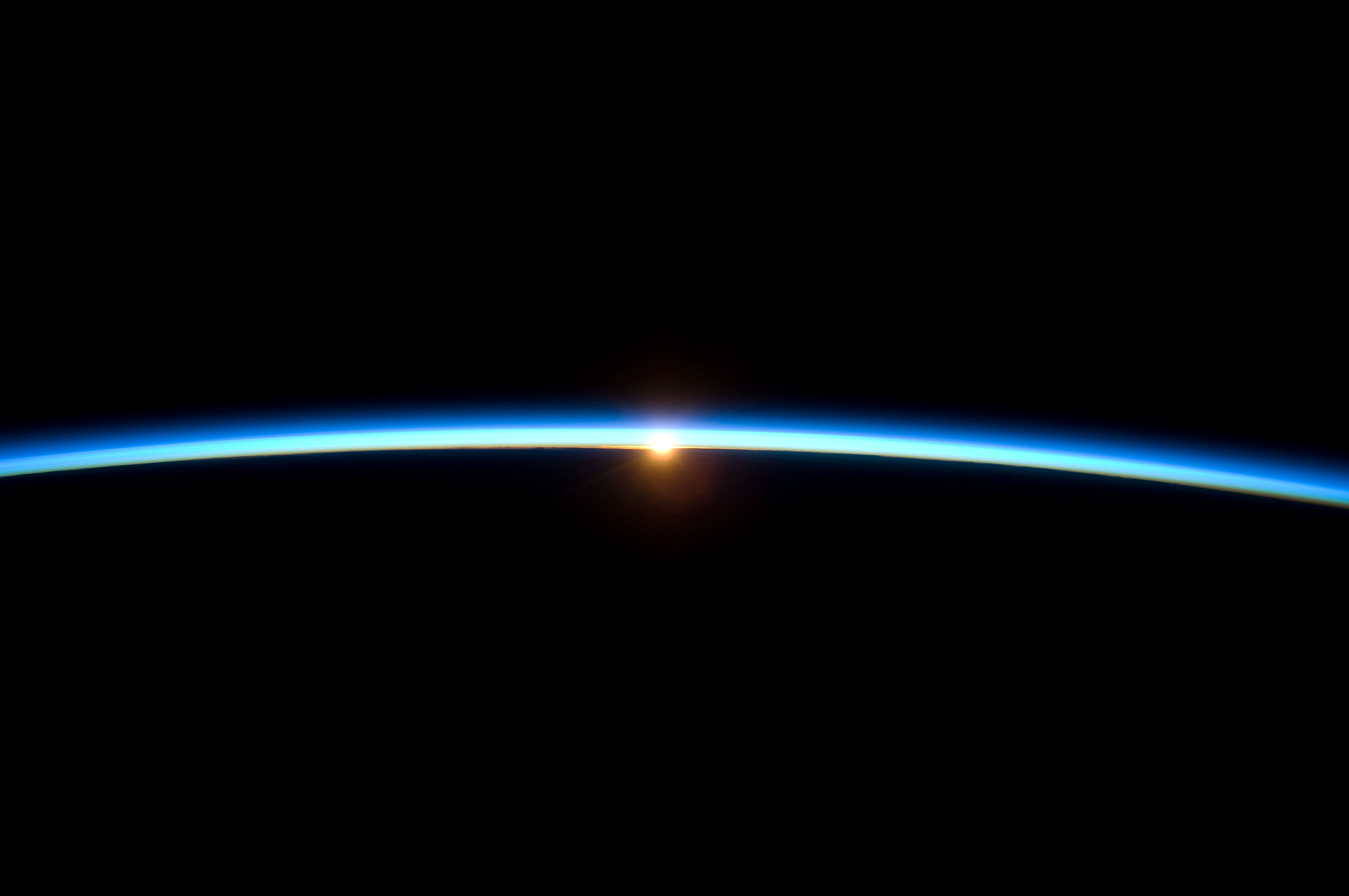
The Thin Blue Line photograph was taken from the International Space Station in 2009. Author Frank White's description of interviews with astronauts emphasized their perception of the "striking thinness of the atmosphere".

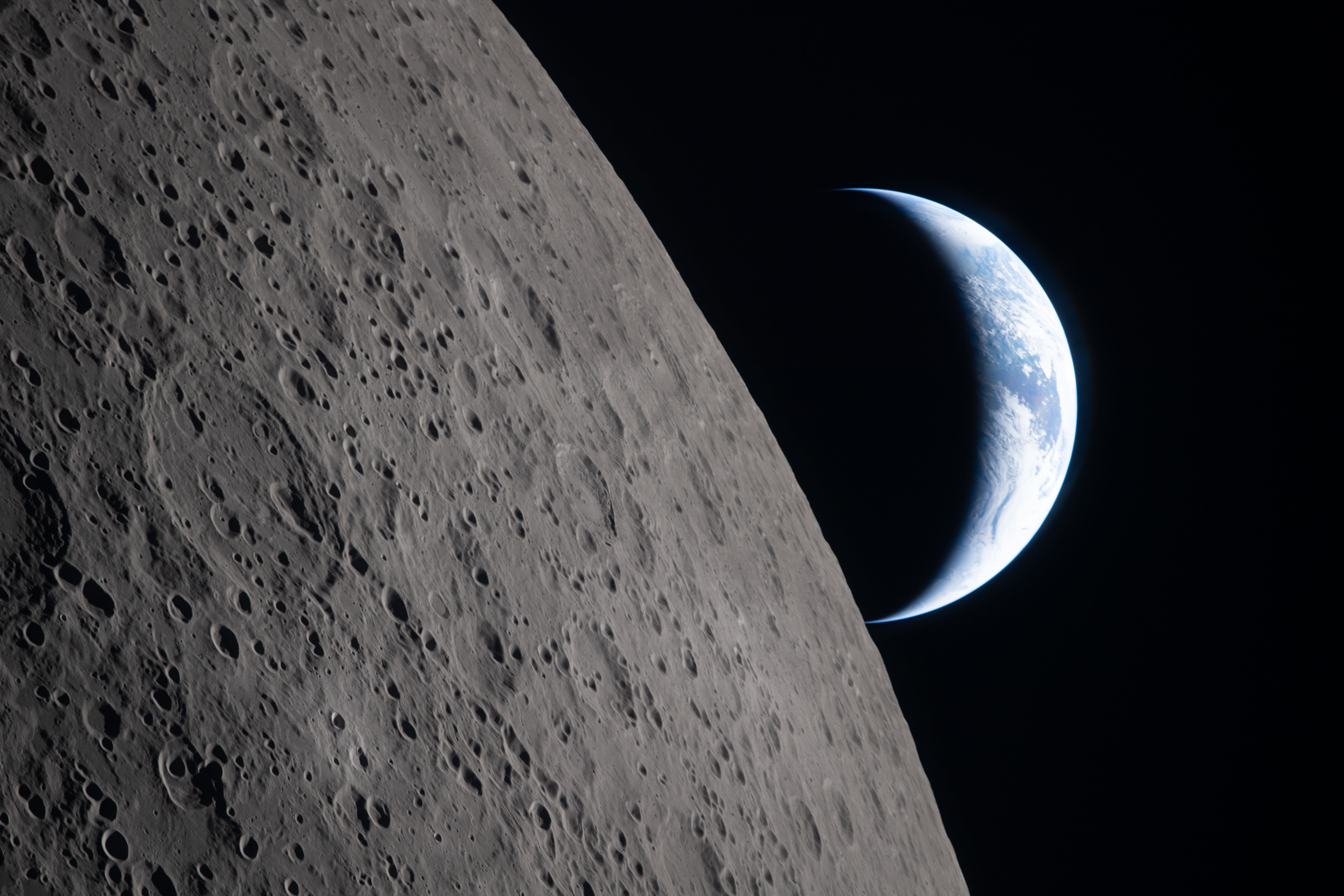
Mission specialist Christina Koch experienced the overview effect in the 2026 Artemis II flight circumnavigating the Moon—photo shown here—Koch saying, "every single person that you know is sustained and inside of that green line" of the Earth's atmosphere.

Michael Collins, Yuri Gagarin, Ron Garan, Chris Hadfield, James Irwin, Mae Jemison, Scott Kelly, Ed Gibson André Kuipers, Jerry Linenger, Mike Massimino, Anne McClain, Leland Melvin, Edgar Mitchell, Sian Proctor, Rusty Schweickart, William Shatner, Nicole Stott, Ed Dwight, Cai Xuzhe, and Jeremy Hansen are among those reported to have experienced the effect.

Yuri Gagarin (Vostok 1; 1961) wrote, "Circling the Earth in a spaceship, I marveled at the beauty of our planet. People, let us preserve and increase this beauty, not destroy it!"

Michael Collins (Apollo 11; 1969) said that "the thing that really surprised me was that it [Earth] projected an air of fragility. And why, I don't know. I don't know to this day. I had a feeling it's tiny, it's shiny, it's beautiful, it's home, and it's fragile".

Edgar Mitchell (Apollo 14; 1971) described it as an "explosion of awareness" and an "overwhelming sense of oneness and connectedness... accompanied by an ecstasy... an epiphany".

Ed Gibson (Skylab 4; 1976) said "In no way could we on earth, or any group of people, or any country, consider ourselves isolated. [...] We're really all in this together".

One day before he died, Wubbo Ockels (STS-61-A; 1985) recorded a plea to the general public for environmental sustainability (which was the focus of his career after his spaceflight), mentioning the exceptional perspective that comes from observing Earth from space.

William Shatner (Blue Origin NS-18, 2021) said immediately after landing that, "Everybody in the world needs to do this. [...] The covering of blue was... the sheet, this blanket, this comforter of blue that we have around us, we think, "Oh, that's blue sky." And then [...] you shoot through it all of a sudden, as though you whip off a sheet off you when you're asleep, and you're looking into blackness, into black ugliness, and you look down. There's the blue down there, and the black up there and it's... There is mother, and Earth, and comfort. And there is — is there death? I don't know. [...] It was so moving to me. This experience, it's something unbelievable."

Ed Dwight (Blue Origin NS-25, 2024) reflected after his suborbital spaceflight, "Out the window, I could see the Earth. Everything looked ordered and neat and wonderful and beautiful. There was no separation between countries or states. And you ask yourself: As wonderful as it all is, why can't the people who live on it get along? Why don't they want to take care of such a beautiful place?"

When Cai Xuzhe (Shenzhou 19, 2024–2025) returned to Earth after six months of living on China's space station he said, "In space, we gazed at the beautiful blue planet countless times. This is the common home for humanity and needs to be protected by all of us together."

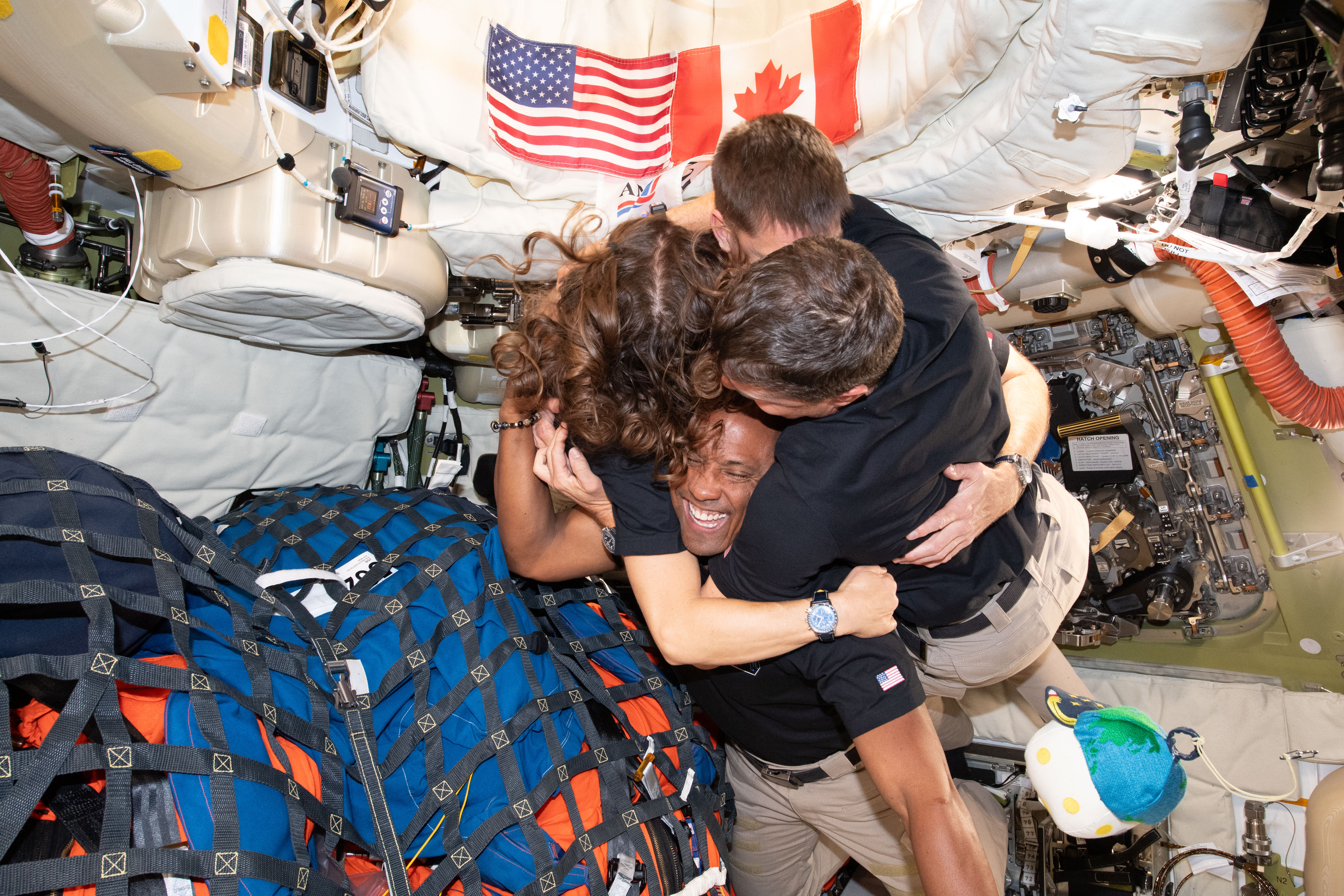
The Artemis II image (April 7, 2026) that accompanied NASA's Moon joy definition (April 10, 2026)

During the April 2026 Artemis II lunar circumnavigation mission, a NASA tweet coined the term Moon joy as "the feeling of intense happiness and excitement that only comes from a mission to the Moon". Astronaut Jeremy Hansen said that the experience reaffirmed his belief that human life had the purpose of finding "the joy in lifting each other up by creating solutions together instead of destroying", and that the view from space was "almost like seeing living proof" of that.

== Lasting impact ==
Researchers have recognized that awe-based experiences—such as interaction with nature, religious or spiritual or mystical experiences, meditation, and peak and flow experiences during high task performance—can change a person and promote the feeling of unity or interconnectedness. Gallagher et al. (2015) defined a set of consensus categories for awe that included being captured by the view or drawn to the phenomenon, experiences of elation, desiring more of the experience, feeling overwhelmed, and scale effects – feelings of the vastness of the universe or of one's own smallness when faced with that vastness. Besides being an enjoyable experience, such phenomena can have short and long-term positive outcomes such as increased well-being, pro-social and pro-environmental attitudes, and improved physical health. The self-transcendent experience can cause long-term changes in personal outlook, and can influence peoples' very sense of self by affecting their self-schema (Note: Yaden et al. (2016) explain that a schema is "an organized conceptual framework through which individuals approach new information and make sense of old experiences. Each of an individual's schemas entails a set of memories, beliefs, and attitudes that create a general cognitive orientation, guiding individuals' interpretation of and response to incoming stimuli". When encountering new experiences, people must "accommodate" by expanding their self-schema framework to take new information into account.) ("the particular framework through which (people) imagine themselves in relation to the world").

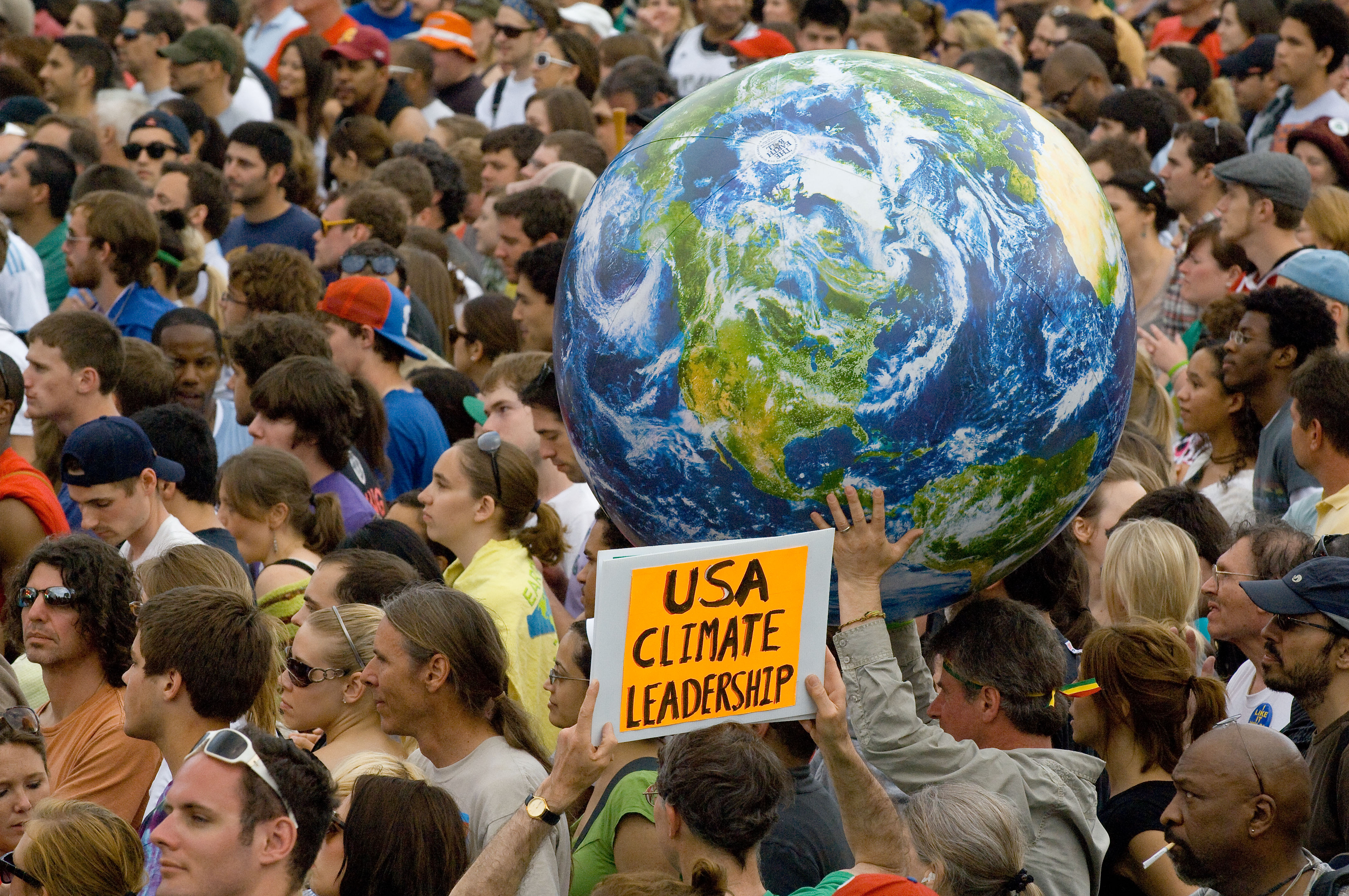
Images of Earth taken from space, which can cause a mild version of the overview effect, have become prominent symbols of environmental concern. Shown: Earth Day demonstration, 2010.

Specifically, Frank White noted that upon return, some astronauts became involved in humanitarian activities, or became artists, with astronaut Edgar Mitchell founding the Institute of Noetic Sciences. Though Yaden et al. (2016) noted that the experience can be transformative, White said in 2019 that generally there was no "dramatic transformation" or "marching in peace parades"; that the lasting effect was more subtle.

A 2018 questionnaire survey of 39 astronauts and cosmonauts found that humanistic changes predominated over spiritual changes. In particular, the survey found a moderate degree of change in the Perceptions of Earth subscale (Earth as "a beautiful, fragile object to be treasured"), which significantly correlated with subsequent involvement in environmental causes. In contrast, the survey found "no to very small change" in the Spiritual Change subscale, which the researchers said likely reflected established pre-launch values.

Immediately after his October 2021 Blue Origin flight, William Shatner told founder Jeff Bezos, "What you have given me is the most profound experience. I hope I never recover from this. I hope that I can maintain what I feel now." However, in October 2022 he recounted that it took hours for him to realize why he wept after stepping out of the spacecraft: "I realized I was in grief for the Earth." He later said that "I saw more clearly than I have... (the) slow death of Earth and we on it." His biography Boldly Go recounted that "it was among the strongest feelings of grief I have ever encountered. The contrast between the vicious coldness of space and the warm nurturing of Earth below filled me with overwhelming sadness. Every day, we are confronted with the knowledge of further destruction of Earth at our hands... It filled me with dread. My trip to space was supposed to be a celebration; instead, it felt like a funeral."

At one point the Skylab 4 (1970s) crew refused to work, asserting, in the flight director's words, "their needs to reflect, to observe, to find their place amid these baffling, fascinating, unprecedented experiences". This event, plus research indicating that actively photographing the Earth has positive psychological effects, caused Yaden et al. to posit that studying the overview effect might improve understanding of psychological well-being in isolated, confined, extreme (ICE) environments such as space flight.

Early photos of Earth taken from space have inspired a mild version of the overview effect in earthbound viewers. The images became prominent symbols of environmental concern and have been credited for raising the public's consciousness about the fragility of Earth and expanding concern for long-term survival on a finite planet.

The accumulating experience of astronauts and space tourists inspires in many of them a strong desire to protect the Earth by actively communicating their broadened perspective, for example by speaking at international climate summits. Virgin Galactic officials specifically cite the overview effect as a motivation for carrying people to the edge of space, to fundamentally change the way people think about their home world. Critics note, however, that the space travel needed to personally experience the full overview effect, itself involves significant environmental pollution. A less polluting approach is to simulate the effect on Earth, with virtual reality technology.

== Simulating the effect ==
Researchers have found that virtual reality technology elicits components of awe-based experiences and can induce minor cognitive shifts in participants' world views similar to those of the overview effect. Perceived safety, personal background and familiarity with the environment, and induction of a small visceral fear reaction, were found to be key contributors to the immersive experience. VR studies through 2019 had not observed a transformative experience on a scale similar to the overview effect itself, but VR experience can trigger profound emotional responses such as awe.

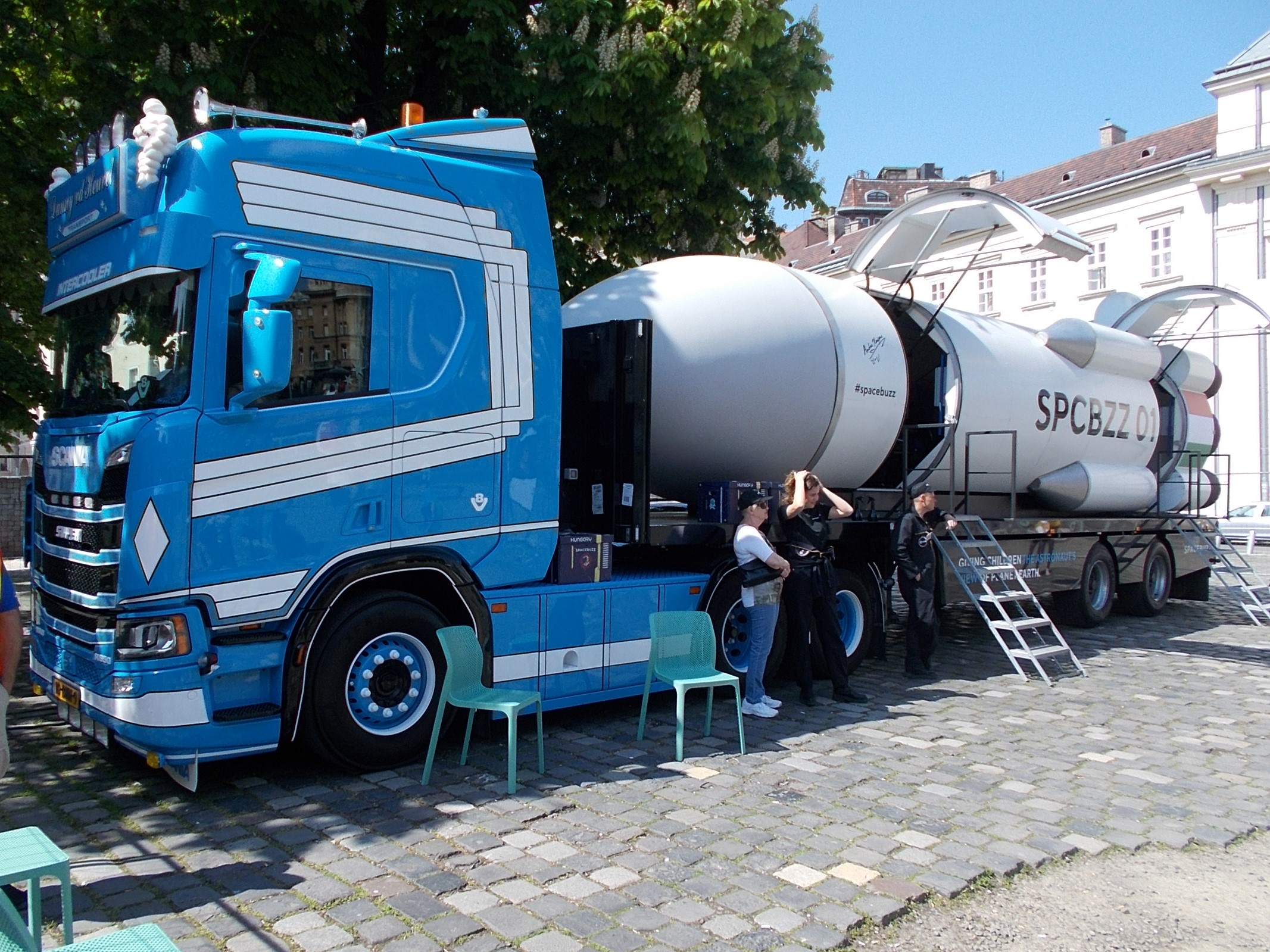
The touring Spacebuzz module uses virtual reality technology to simulate spaceflight for children.

A 2019 study found that a virtual experience invoked "minor transformative experiences in some participants", including appreciation of beauty and vastness, realization of interconnectedness, and a potential intent to change one's behavior. Recognizing the relatively early state of VR technology, the researchers urged using knowledge of profound transformative experiences to motivate the design of VR installations, and thereafter study the VR experience itself as its own phenomenon.

On December 24, 2018, the fiftieth anniversary of the first day on which humans saw an earthrise with their own eyes, the Spacebuzz project was unveiled in Hilversum, Netherlands. Within a mobile, rocket-shaped vehicle more than 15 metres (49 ft) in length, Spacebuzz's nine moving seats and virtual reality (VR) headsets simulate spaceflight in an experience designed especially for children.

Researchers at the University of Missouri tried to reproduce the experience with a sensory deprivation tank and a waterproof VR headset.

"The Infinite" provides an hour-long simulation of being on the International Space Station using 360-degree, 3D, astronaut-recorded footage from the VR film Space Explorers: The ISS Experience. Visitors share a 12,500-square-foot (1,160 m^{2}) area allowing them to physically explore the ISS and look outside.

A three-dimensional model of the Earth 7 metres (23 ft) in diameter, created from detailed NASA imagery and appearing to float in the air, toured the U.K. in 2022, the installation "aim[ing] to create a sense of the Overview Effect".

== Other names ==
The overview effect has been referred to as the big picture effect (Edgar Mitchell), orbital perspective (Ronald J. Garan Jr.), and the astronaut's secret (Albert Sacco).

Referring to how profound Mitchell's experience on the Moon was—distinguished from experiences in low Earth orbit—author Frank White called Mitchell's experience universal insight as it had a more universal perspective.

== Related effects ==
A 1957 article in The Journal of Aviation Medicine studied the break-off phenomenon, which it defined as "a feeling of physical separation from the earth when piloting an aircraft at high altitude". Main precipitating factors were concluded to be: flying alone, at high altitude, with relatively little to do. Researchers summarized pilots' descriptions as "a feeling of being isolated, detached, or separated physically from the earth" or as a perception of "somehow losing their connection with the world". Individual reactions ranged from exhilaration or feeling nearer to God, to anxiety, fear, or loneliness. Alan Shepard reported feeling underwhelmed, and others reported feeling an attachment with the spacecraft rather than Earth, effects one researcher interpreted as a concept of disorientation. Scientific literature covering the break-off phenomenon ended in 1973.

Anthropologist Deana L. Weibel introduced the term ultraview effect as a response to an unobscured view of stars, an effect that she concluded was experienced more rarely than the overview effect. Contrasted from the overview effect's sense of connection, the ultraview effect responds to the limitations of our knowledge, causing "a transformative sense of incomprehension and a feeling of shrinking or self-diminution".

Frank White posited the term Copernicus Perspective—awareness of being part of the Solar System when one is on another planet.

Science historian Jordan Bimm described how the concept shares similarities with the British concept of the sublime—an experience associated with views from high mountains.

Some aquanauts who live and work underwater for extended periods report cognitive shifts in how they perceive the ocean environment and their role in it, strengthening feelings of connectedness and commitment to the marine environment. As a result this experience has been called the underview effect, referencing the overview effect of astronauts because of its similarities with it.

NASA astronaut Victor Glover said the overview effect's potency is closely tied to the "sea level effect"–humanity's shared experience on Earth.

== See also ==
- Collective consciousness
- Earth in culture
- Earth phase
- Effect of spaceflight on the human body
- Extraterrestrial sky
- Pale Blue Dot
- Noctcaelador
- Panorama
- The Real
- Scale (analytical tool)
- Space For Humanity
- Spaceship Earth
- Space psychology
