= Vladimir Myasishchev (psychologist) =

Soviet physiologist and psychiatrist (1893–1973)

- Born: Vladimir Nikolayevich Myasishchev; 11 July 1893; Friedrichstadt, Governorate of Livonia, Russian Empire
- Died: 4 October 1973 (aged 80); Leningrad, RSFSR, Soviet Union
- Education: Saint Petersburg Psychoneurological Institute
- Scientific career
- Fields: Psychology; Medical Psychology
- Workplaces: Brain Institute, Saint Petersburg Psychoneurological Institute

Vladimir Nikolayevich Myasishchev (Russian: Влади́мир Никола́евич Мяси́щев; 11 July 1893 – 4 October 1973) was a Soviet psychiatrist and developmental psychologist.

== Biography ==
Myasishchev was born in Latvia. He studied at the medical faculty of Saint Petersburg Psychoneurological Institute and graduated from it in 1919. Director of the Psychoneurological Institute in 1939–1961. In 1945–1973 professor of Leningrad University, where he was instrumental in establishing the Faculty of Psychology.

== Scientific work ==
In 1914 Myasishchev published his first scientific article. He researched microstructural changes to brain tissue accompanied by functional impairment of its activity. His research encompasses problems of Psychopathology, Clinical Psychophysiology and Medical Psychology. Proposed the term "systemic neuroses" describing diseases conditioned by reactive psychogenetic factors to which the patient's personality reacts with disturbances that are fixated and intensified in the future. Researched borderline states and their treatment, sought to distinguish them from neuroses, studied the problem of norm, psychosomatic health and its restoration. Myasishchev's conceptions were influenced by psychoanalysis.

In 1921 he contributed towards the First Conference on Scientific Organization of Labour, where he rejected Frederick Taylor's proposal to turn man into a machine. Dull monotonous work was a temporary necessity until a corresponding machine can be developed.

Having accepted the thesis of Marx and Engels that the essence of man is a set of social relations, Myasishchev developed the psychology of relationships and, on its basis, developed the concept of psychogenies and pathogenetic, or psychogenetic, psychotherapy; at the same time, he adopted a number of ideas from psychoanalysis.

In 1948 posed the problem of relations as conscious selective contacts of a person with the material and social milieu determining the person's mental characteristics and qualities and actualizing it the person's activity. In 1960 he developed common works of relations problem. Relationship Psychology deals with conscious attitude of a person towards his environment and himself ensuring synthetic and dynamic understanding of personality as oneness of subject and object.

== Books ==
- Myasishchev, V. N. (1960). Personality and Neuroses.
- Myasishchev, V. N. Psychological Attributes of Personality" (Volume I, "Character", and Volume II, "Abilities") (in collab. with A. Kovalyov), 1957-1960.
- Myasishchev, V. N. (1966). Introduction to Medical Psychology.

== See also ==
- Vladimir Bekhterev
