= Kalpana =

Kalpana may refer to:

== Film and television ==
- Kalpana (1948 film), an Indian Hindi-language dance film
- Kalpana (1960 film), a romantic Bollywood film
- Kalpana (1970 film), an Indian Malayalam film
- Kalpana (2012 film), an Indian Kannada-language comedy horror film
  - Kalpana 2, its 2016 sequel
- Kalpana (TV series), an Indian TV series
- Kalpana Shetty, fictional character in the 2008 Indian film Ghajini, played by Asin

== People ==
=== Mononym ===
- Kalpana (Kannada actress) (1943–1979), Indian Kannada film actress
- Kalpana (Malayalam actress) (1965–2016), Indian Malayalam film actress

=== Surname ===
- Venkatacher Kalpana (born 1961), Indian cricketer

=== Given name ===
- Kalpana Chakma, Bangladeshi indigenous women's rights activist
- Kalpana Chawla (1961–2003), Indian American astronaut lost in the Space Shuttle Columbia disaster
- Kalpana Dash (born 1966), Indian lawyer and mountaineer
- Kalpana Datta (1913–1995), Indian independence movement activist and fighter
- Kalpana Iyer (born c. 1950), Indian beauty pageant contestant and Hindi film actress
- Kalpana. K (born 1980), Indian aerospace engineer and scientist
- Kalpana Kartik (born 1931), Indian Hindi film actress
- Kalpana Lajmi (1954–2018), Indian film director, producer and screenwriter
- Kalpana Mohan (1946–2012), Indian Hindi film actress
- Kalpana Ramesh Narhire (born 1969), Indian politician from Osmanabad, Maharashtra
- Kalpana Pandit, Indian Hindi actress, model and physician
- Kalpana Patowary, Indian singer
- Kalpana Raghavendar, Indian playback singer
- Kalpana Swaminathan (born 1956), Indian writer and doctor
- Kalpana Reddy, Kannada Doordarshan News anchor and lead actress in "27 Mavalli Circle"

== Other uses ==
- Kalpana (imagination), a Vedantic view
- Kalpana (poetry), collection by Rabindranath Tagore.
- Kalpana (supercomputer), at NASA's Ames Research Center
- Kalpana (company), inventor of the first Ethernet network switch
- Kalpana-1, an Indian meteorological satellite
