= Endeavour (supercomputer) =

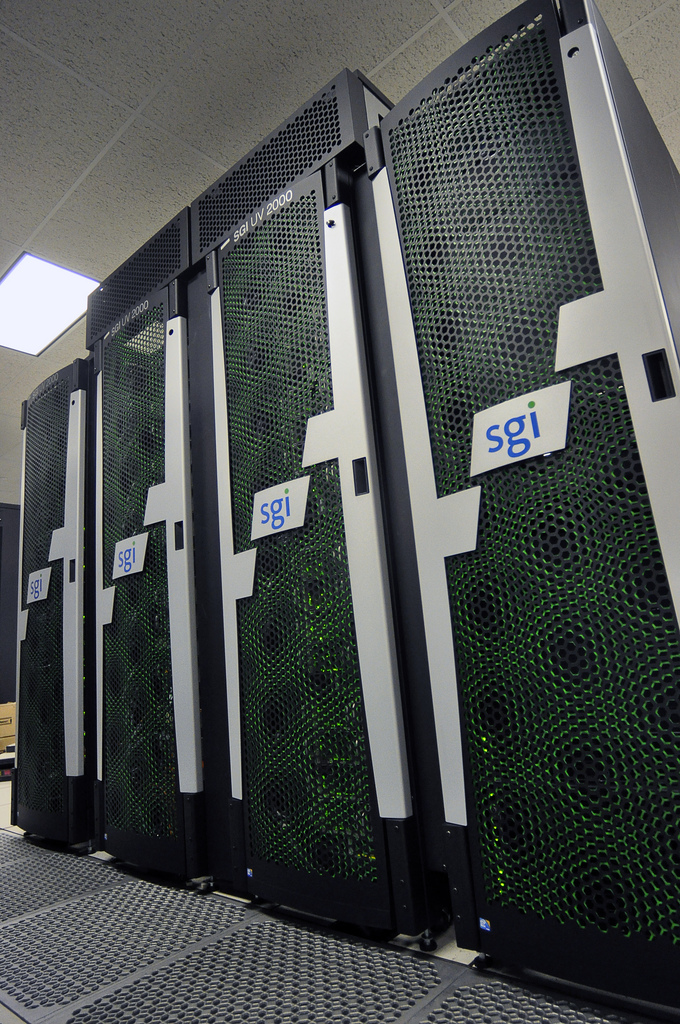
- Active: 2013 - Present
- Sponsors: NASA, USA
- Operators: NAS, SGI
- Location: NASA Advanced Supercomputing Division at NASA Ames Research Center
- Architecture: SGI UV 2000, 1,536 Intel Xeon E5-4650L processor shared-memory system, Linux
- Power: 32 teraflops
- Memory: 6 TB
- Speed: 2.6 GHz

Endeavour is a shared memory supercomputer at the NASA Advanced Supercomputing (NAS) Division at NASA Ames Research Center. It was named after the Space Shuttle Endeavour, the last orbiter built during NASA's Space Shuttle Program.

Built in February 2013 as a replacement for the Columbia supercomputer, it consists of two nodes across three SGI UV 2000 racks with 1,536 Intel Xeon E5-4650L “Sandy Bridge” processors for a theoretical processing capability of 32 teraflops. Its global shared-memory environment allows for one processor to access the memory of other processors in the cluster as needed, giving users the ability to run jobs larger and more data-intensive than could be achieved on other NASA systems limited by processor memory. At the time it was installed, Endeavour had more processing power than what remained of Columbia at its decommissioning (approximately 30 teraflops across 40 SGI Altix 4700 racks), but in only ten percent of the physical space.

It is currently one of two systems owned and operated by the NASA Advanced Supercomputing Division, along with Pleiades, NASA's flagship supercomputer based on SGI ICE architecture and several generations of Intel Xeon processors.
