= NPB (disambiguation) =

Nippon Professional Baseball (NPB) is the highest level of professional baseball in Japan.

NPB can also refer to:

- NAS Parallel Benchmarks, a supercomputer benchmark
- National Parole Board, now the Parole Board of Canada
- National Printing Bureau of Japan
- National Pork Board of the United States
- Neuropeptide B
- Northern Black Polished Ware
- n-propyl bromide, a solvent
- Nederlandsche Padvinders Bond, one of the scouting organizations that evolved into Scouting Nederland
