= Chinta =

Chinta may refer to:

- Chinta (mentation), a Sanskrit word that refers to mental activity
- Chinta (film), a 1948 Singaporean romantic drama film
- Chinta Valley, a tourist destination in Jammu. There is a village on the hills above the valley called "Chinta". The stream through the valley is the "Chinta Nallah".
