= Merope (supercomputer) =

NASA supercomputer

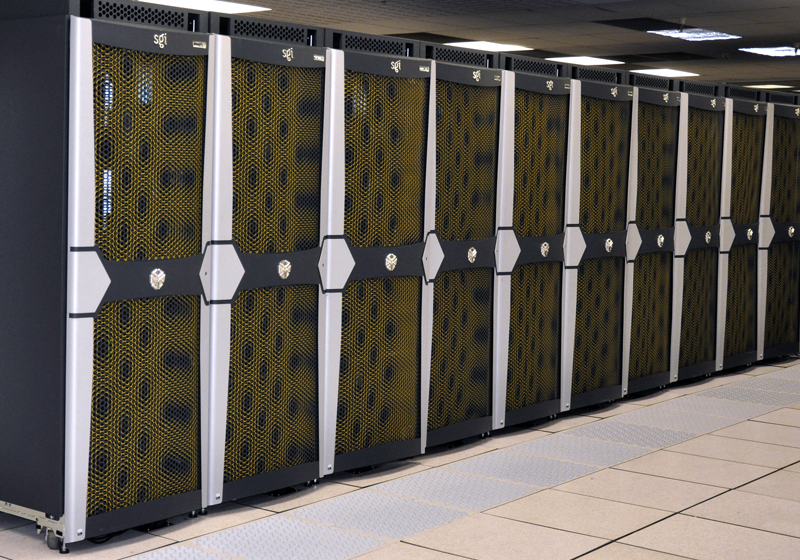

Design
- Manufacturer: Silicon Graphics International
- Release date: circa 2016
- Decommission date: May 12, 2021

System
- Operating system: SUSE Linux Enterprise Server
- CPU: Intel Xeon X5670
- Memory: 86 TB
- FLOPS: 252 teraflops

Merope was a cluster composed of repurposed Intel Xeon X5670 (Westmere) processors that were once part of the Pleiades supercomputer. The system is used both for running real-world computational jobs for NASA scientists and engineers and for testing purposes. Housed in an auxiliary processing center located about 1 kilometer from the NAS facility at NASA Ames Research Center.

Merope (pronounced MEH-reh-pee) is named after one of the seven stars that make up the Pleiades open star cluster in the constellation Taurus.
