= Columbia (supercomputer) =

NASA Supercomputer

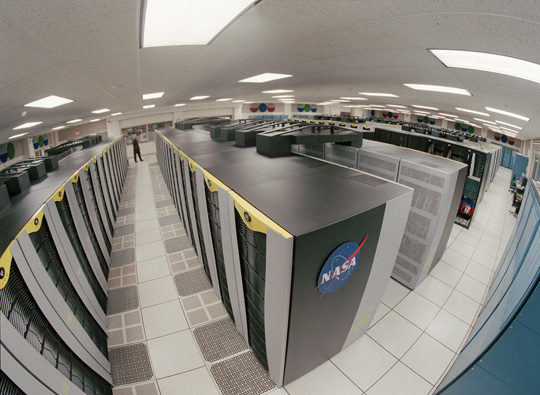
- The original 10,240-processor Columbia supercomputer at the NAS Facility
- Active: 2004 - 2013
- Sponsors: National Aeronautics and Space Administration (NASA), USA
- Operators: NAS, SGI
- Location: NASA Advanced Supercomputing Division at NASA Ames Research Center, Moffett Field, California
- Architecture: SGI Altix 3700/4700, 10,240 Intel Itanium 2 processors, InfiniBand SDR and DDR interconnect
- Operating system: SUSE Linux Enterprise Server
- Memory: 20 terabytes
- Storage: 440 terabytes of online storage, 10 petabytes of archival tape storage
- Speed: 63 teraflops theoretical performance
- Ranking: TOP500: 2, November 2004

Columbia was a supercomputer built by Silicon Graphics (SGI) for the National Aeronautics and Space Administration (NASA), installed in 2004 at the NASA Advanced Supercomputing (NAS) facility located at Moffett Field in California. Named in honor of the crew who died in the Space Shuttle Columbia disaster, it increased NASA's supercomputing capacity ten-fold for the agency's science, aeronautics and exploration programs.

Missions run on Columbia include high-fidelity simulations of the Space Shuttle vehicle and launch systems, hurricane track prediction, global ocean circulation, and the physics of supernova detonations.

== History ==
Columbia debuted as the second most powerful supercomputer on the TOP500 list in November 2004 at a LINPACK rating of 51.87 teraflops, or 51.87 trillion floating point calculations per second. By June 2007 it had dropped to 13th.

It was originally composed of 20 interconnected SGI Altix 3700 512-processor multi-rack systems running SUSE Linux Enterprise, using Intel Itanium 2 Montecito and Montvale processors. In 2006, NASA and SGI added four new Altix 4700 nodes containing 256 dual-core processors, which decreased the physical footprint and the power cost of the supercomputer. The nodes were connected with InfiniBand single and double data rate (SDR and DDR) cabling with transfer speeds of up to 10 gigabits per second.

The SGI Altix platform was selected due to a positive experience with Kalpana, a single-node Altix 512-CPU system built and operated by NASA and SGI and named after Columbia astronaut Kalpana Chawla, the first Indian-born woman to fly in space. Kalpana was later integrated into the Columbia supercomputer system as the first node of twenty.

At its peak, Columbia had a total of 10,240 processors and 20 terabytes of memory, 440 terabytes of online storage utilizing SGI's CXFS filesystem, and 10 petabytes of archival tape storage. The Project Columbia team, composed mostly of computer scientists and engineers from NAS, SGI, and Intel, were awarded the Government Computer News (GCN) Agency Award for Innovation in 2005 for deploying Columbia's original 10,240 processors in an unprecedented 120 days.

It was slowly phased out as its successors at NAS, the petascale Pleiades supercomputer and the Endeavour shared-memory system, expanded to meet with NASA's growing high-end computing needs. At the time of its decommissioning in March 2013, Columbia was made up of four nodes over 40 SGI Altix 4700 racks, containing Intel Itanium 2 Montecito and Montvale processors to make up a total of 4,608 cores with a theoretical peak of 30 teraflops and total memory of 9 terabytes.
