= Lakshana =

Sanskrit term

- Samkhya: Kapila
- Yoga: Patanjali
- Vaisheshika: Kaṇāda, Prashastapada
- Secular: Valluvar

Lakshana (Sanskrit: लक्षण lakṣaṇa) – derived from the combination of words lakshya and kshana – means 'indication' or 'symptom'. It also means 'an auspicious mark', 'attribute' or 'quality'.

== Grammatical implication ==
In Varadarāja's Laghukaumudi (St.210), on the following Paniniya Sukta I.i.62 on Sanskrit grammar, which reads:

प्रत्ययलोपे प्रत्ययलक्षणम् |

states that when elision (lopa) of an affix has taken place, the affix shall still exert its influence, and the operations dependent upon it will take place as if it were present. He explains that the word, Lakshana, signifies that by which a thing is recognized, and the word, Lopa signifies the elision i.e. substitution of a blank, in which regard Sakalya had suggested certain optional substitutions as stated in Sukta VIII.iii.19. Vardaraja draws attention to Panini’s statement referred to at St.152 to the effect that after whatsoever there is an affix (pratyaya) enjoined, let what begins therewith, in the form in which it appears when the affix follows it, be called an inflective base (anga) e.g. in the case of addressing two or more persons of the same name, say - Rama, the Ramas need not be addressed as Oh two Ramas but the -s is to be dropped without change in meaning (intention) and addressed as Oh Rama which would suffice the intended purpose.

== Religious and ethical implication ==
Vyasa-bhashya (VIII.13) explains that in the smallest particle of time or kshana the whole universe undergoes a change. Each moment or particle of time is only the manifestation of that change, and time does not have a separate existence. Appearance is called Dharma, and the arrangement of objects or qualities is called Dharmin; the change of appearance is called Dharma-parinama which has two aspects – Lakshana-parinama and Avastha-parinama, which are not intrinsically different. Lakshana-parinama considers three stages of an appearance viz. a) the unmanifested when it exists in the future, b) the manifested moment of the present and c) the past when it has been manifested, lost to view but preserved and retained in all the onwards stages of evolution. Avastha-parinama is change of condition which is not materially different from Lakshana-parinama and hence its mode; it is on account of this that an object is called new or old, grown or decayed. It is the nature of the Guṇas that there cannot remain even a moment without the evolutionary changes of dharma, lakshana and avastha, for movement is the characteristic of the gunas whose nature is the cause of constant movement, which changes the mind also experiences in accordance with its two qualities visible and invisible; the visible qualities are those whose changes can be noticed as conscious states or thought-products or precepts, whereas the invisible qualities are those whose changes can only be established by inference. There is an order in all successive changes (Vacaspati in his Tattva–vaivasaradi (III.15).

Dharma, which provides security, peace and well-being, is concerned equally to the individual and his other worldly interests and to the worldly interest of the individual, family and society. Dharma embraces man’s life as a whole. The two goals of man’s individual and collective existence signified by the words abhyudaya ('prosperity') and nihsreyasa ('necessaries') are attained by following a two-fold dharma – 1) Pravritti Lakshana Dharma ('religion of action') that is characterized by action and 2) Nivritti Lakshana Dharma ('religion of renunciation') which is characterized by freedom from action.

== Philosophical implication ==
Advaita Vedanta refers to the three meanings that all words and sentences carry – the primary or direct meaning, the implied meaning and the suggested meaning. The implied meaning, known as Lakshana, is of three kinds – Jahallakshana which consists in discarding the direct meaning in favour of the indirect or implied meaning, Ajahallakshana in which the direct meaning is not completely given up and the real meaning is hinted, and Jahadjahallakshana which consists in giving up a part of the direct meaning and retaining the other part. Thus, the word "that" of the mahavakya – tat tvam asi (that thou art) primarily refers to the Saguna Brahman or Ishvara, and the word "thou" primarily to the Jiva, the individual soul. The direct sense points to the identity of between Ishvara and Jiva. The implied meaning reveals that Ishvara and Jiva are the result of ignorance and the imposition of the unreal on the real when "that" refers to the Nirguna Brahman, the pure consciousness who is absolute and without attributes and "thou" refers to self or atman, the pure consciousness which is the reality underlying the mind-body complex. It is according to the third Lakshana that the identity of Brahman and Atman is established, that these two words in their implicit sense point to the same reality, that Brahma-anubhava is the non-dual experience of the sole reality.

== Lakshana Jnanam of classical music ==
The student of classical music – after faithfully evaluating the effect of listening and observation as aids for sadhana – strives to study the role of acquiring Lakshana Jnanam ('theoretical knowledge') as an aid to Lakshya Sadhana ('practical attainment') in order to uplift knowledge of music gained and realizing its practical utilities/applications. Mere theoretical knowledge, the arohana and avarohana of a raga is not Lakshana Jnanam, for the body is first formed and only thereafter infused with life. Lakshya (target or aim to be accomplished) is based on Kalpana ('imagination','inspiration') and Lakshana is like grammar, the former is not clear without the latter. The knowledge of Lakshana is essential for Lakshya sadhana.

== Prognostic implication ==
In matters pertaining to the prediction of future events, the word, Lakshana, means a mark or an omen. In this system, eight different methods are employed:

- Anga ('Limbs') (Anga Shastra), which takes into account different parts of the body,
- Svapna ('Dream'), by which ones press dreams,
- Svara ('Sound') attaches importance to utterances by birds and animals,
- Bhomi ('Attitude') refers to one’s behaviour, walk, posture etc.;
- Vyanjana ('Birth-marks') refers to birthmarks such as moles, spots etc.;
- Lakshana ('Omen'),
- Utpatha ('Catastrophe') refers to phenomena such as earth-quake, volcanic eruption etc.; and
- Antariksha ('Heavenly'), on the appearance of comets, circle round the Moon, etc.

According to numerology, numbers pregnant with more than one meaning and significance, indicate the course of future events. According to Anga Ranga, a very ancient method, women are divided into four distinct classes of temperament that correspond to the four phases of liberation (moksa).

== See also ==
- mahā-lakṣaṇa ("great lakṣaṇa"), physical characteristics of the Buddha
