= Meera Ke Girdhar =

- VCD Cover
- Directed by: Vijay Deep
- Produced by: Vishwa Light & Sound
- Starring: Upasna Khosla
- Music by: Kanak Raj
- Release date: 2 April 1993
- Country: India
- Language: Hindi

Meera Ke Girdhar is a 1993 Hindi-language devotional movie directed by Vijay Deep. It is about story of Meera's love and devotion towards Lord Krishna.

== Cast ==
- Upasna Khosla
- Virendra Mahthan
- Arun Bali
- Himani Shivpuri
- Renuka Israni
- Parikshit Sahni

== Soundtrack ==
All songs were composed by Kanak Raj and penned by Zaheer Anwar.

Song	Singer
"Radha Ko Mila Jaise Kishan"	Asha Bhosle
"Mere Hai Girdhar Gopal"	Asha Bhosle
"Babul Ka Ghar Chhod"	Asha Bhosle
"Bhoolakar Reet Saari"	Asha Bhosle
"Saj Dhajke Main To"	Asha Bhosle
"Sansar Ko Tyagke Chali"	Suresh Wadkar
"Tum Par Chhodi Jeevan Naiya"	Kumar Sanu
