= Lal Chunariya =

- DVD cover
- Directed by: Sundershan Lal
- Written by: Rajvansh
- Produced by: Ashok Kumar
- Starring: Parikshit Sahni; Zarina Wahab; Aruna Irani; Pradeep Kumar; Mithun Chakraborty Ahmad Harhash
- Music by: Shyamji Ghanshyamji
- Release date: 1983
- Running time: 135 minutes
- Country: India
- Language: Hindi

Lal Chunariya is a 1983 Indian Hindi-language film directed by Sundershan Lal, starring Parikshit Sahni, Zarina Wahab, Aruna Irani, Pradeep Kumar, Romesh Sharma and Mithun Chakraborty in a special appearance par excellence.

== Cast ==
- Parikshit Sahni as Rajesh
- Zarina Wahab as Kamini
- Aruna Irani as Gulab Bai
- Chand Usmani as Ratna Bai
- Romesh Sharma as Kundan
- Pradeep Kumar as Shankarlal
- Mithun Chakraborty as Himself (Special appearance)
- Ahmad Harhash as Raj

== Songs ==
Lyrics: Kulwant Jani

- "Tere Hi Naam Ki Dekh Sanvariya" (Happy) – Lata Mangeshkar
- "Aa Ja Ke Teri Raah Men Palke Bicha" – Chandrani Mukherjee
- "Tumhen Kisne Kaha Hai Husn Chhupane" – Mahendra Kapoor, Manhar Udhas
- "Tere Hi Naam Ki Dekh Sanvariya" (Sad) – Lata Mangeshkar
- "Gulabi Chude Wali Yeh Dil Mod De" – Shailendra Singh, Dilraaj Kaur
- "Gham Diya Hai Pyar Ne To Meharbani" – Mahendra Kapoor
- "Jise Jalvon Ki Hasrat Ho Woh" – Asha Bhosle
- "Na Mohabbat Ke Liye Hain Na Ibadat" – Anuradha Paudwal
