= Gul Gulshan Gulfaam =

- Directed by: Ved Rahi
- Starring: Parikshit Sahni, Radha Seth, Upendra Khashu and N. K. Phull
- Theme music composer: Krishan Langoo
- Country of origin: India
- No. of episodes: 45

Production
- Producer: Prem Krishen

Original release
- Network: DD National
- Release: 1987

Gul Gulshan Gulfaam is a 1987 DD National television serial directed by Ved Rahi and produced by Prem Krishen (Cinevistaas). It was one of the first serials to be based in Kashmir and portray a Kashmiri family: It became an instant hit and ran for 45 episodes.

Parikshit Sahni, Radha Seth and N. K. Phull played the leads, along with Neena Gupta, Pankaj Berry, Kanwaljit Singh.From Srinagar many local artists participated in the series, which included big names like Upendra Khashu, Tariq Javeed, Shadi Lal Koul, Vinay Raina, among others. A young Kunal Khemu, then living in Srinagar, was part of the show, making his debut as an actor. It was re-telecast on Sahara TV in 2002.

== Storyline ==
Gul Gulshan Gulfaam portrayed a Kashmiri family making a living from their three houseboats: 'Gul' ('flower'), 'Gulshan' ('garden' or 'buckeye'), and 'Gulfam' ('gardener'). Their livelihood is threatened as running houseboats for tourists takes a hit due to terrorism. Outdoor scenes were mostly shot in Srinagar.

== Cast ==
- Parikshit Sahni
- Radha Seth
- N. K. Phull
- Neena Gupta
- Pankaj Berry
- Kanwaljit Singh
- Upendra Khashu
- Tariq Javeed
- Shadi Lal Koul
- Vinay Raina
- Kunal Khemu

== Music ==
The music was given by noted Kashmiri composer Krishan Langoo.
