= Parikshit Sahni =

Indian film and television actor

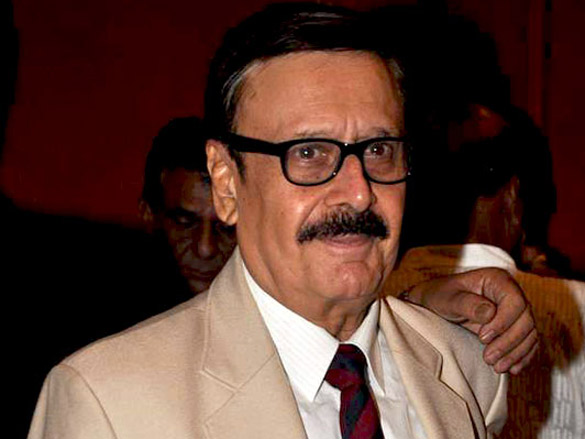
- Sahni in 2011
- Born: 1 January 1939 (age 87); Muree, Punjab, British India (present-day Punjab, Pakistan)
- Other names: Parikshat Sahni; Ajay Sahni
- Education: The Lawrence School, Sanawar
- Occupation: Actor
- Years active: 1968–present
- Spouses: Aruna Kapoor (died); Dr. Nandini Sahni
- Children: 3
- Father: Balraj Sahni
- Relatives: Bhisham Sahni (uncle)
- Family: Anand–Sahni family
- Website: parikshatsahni.com

Parikshit Sahni (born 1 January 1939) is an Indian film and television actor who has worked in Hindi and Punjabi cinema. He is known for his roles in the TV series Barrister Vinod, Gul Gulshan Gulfaam (Doordarshan) and Gaatha (Star Plus). He has also appeared several films including three of Rajkumar Hirani's blockbuster films Lage Raho Munna Bhai, 3 Idiots, and PK.

He is the son of actor Balraj Sahni and nephew of writer Bhisham Sahni.

== Early life ==
He was born on 1 January 1939 at Muree in the Rawalpindi District of the Punjab Province of British India (present day in the Murree District of Punjab, Pakistan), into a Punjabi Hindu family. He was named by Rabindranath Tagore while his father was teaching English at Visva-Bharati University in Shantiniketan, and his mother was doing her Bachelors. Most of his schooling was done at the Lawrence school Sanawar. He then went to study at Delhi's St. Stephen's College.

Later, Sahni began his career as a child artist.

== Personal life ==
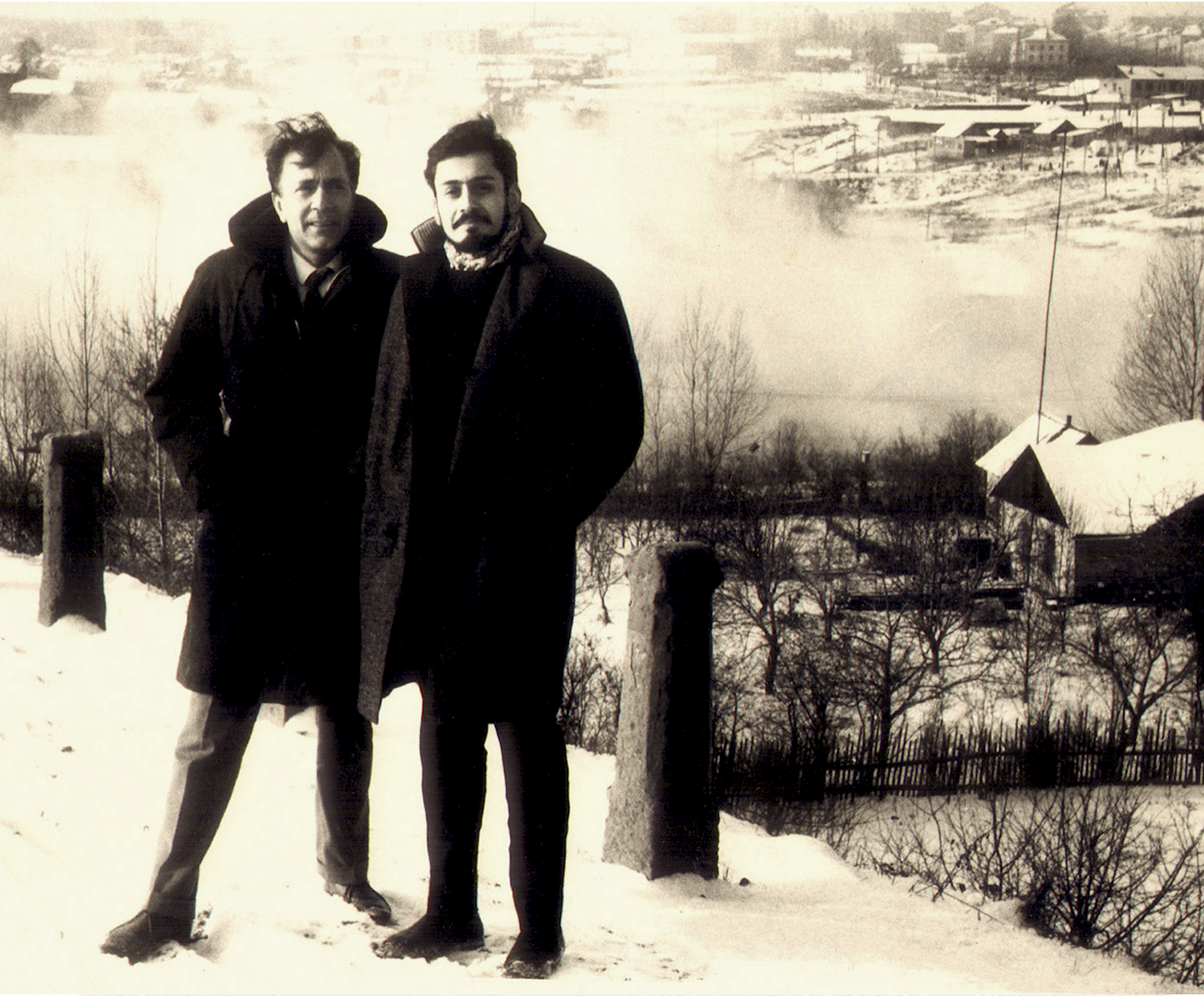
Balraj Sahni and son Prikshit Sahni, Moscow c. 1965.

Sahni's parents were both theatre and film actors, although his mother (Damayanti Sahni) acted in only a couple of films before her death at an early age in 1947. After her death, his father married Santosh Chandhok two years later.

He was married to Aruna Kapur. Aditi Sahni and Tania Sahni were his daughters from first marriage. After Aruna died, Sahni married Dr. Nandini and had son Varunjai Sahni.

On the advice of his uncle, Bhishm Sahani, Parikshit Sahni was sent by his father to attend a five-year course in architecture in Moscow. However, since he was poor in maths, he was advised to get admission in Moscow Cinema Institute. He cleared the aptitude test and joined the five-year course in film direction in the Moscow Cinema Institute. He returned in 1966 and started his film career in India. He assisted Raj Kapoor in Mera Naam Joker because Kapoor needed a person who could help him in working with the Russian Circus but he left that to act in Anokhi Raat.

Sahni even changed his screen name to Ajay Sahni at the suggestion of his friend Sanjeev Kumar during the shooting of their 1968 film Anokhi Raat, before eventually reverting to his own name a few years later.

== Career ==
Sahni starred in the classic Punjabi film Marhi Da Diva (1989), with Raj Babbar, Pankaj Kapur, Kanwaljit Singh, and Deepti Naval. He played a remarkable role in the Hindi film Pavitra Paapi (1970) which was based on a Punjabi novel by Nanak Singh (a famous novelist). Pavitra Paapi also featured his real life father, Balraj Sahni in a pivotal role.

He acted in the Doordarshan television series The Great Maratha as Malhar Rao Holkar. He produced and acted in the popular TV series Gul Gulshan Gulfaam (1987) on DD National.

One of his most famous films was the Amitabh and Shashi Kapoor starer Kaala Patthar. He acted in the film 3 Idiots in which he played the role of R. Madhavan's father. He acted in the TV series Heena as Nawab Mirza, Heena's father. Heena ended in 2003. Sahni played Veer Singh (Kakasa) on the popular Zee TV serial Saat Phere: Saloni Ka Safar opposite Nivedita Bhattacharya.

== Books ==
- The Non-conformist: Memories of My Father Balraj Sahni, Penguin Random House, 2019.
- Strange Encounters: Adventures of a Curious Life, Simon and Schuster, 2022.

== Filmography ==
=== Films ===
Year	Film	Role
1951	Deedar	Child Shyamu
1968	Anokhi Raat	Painter
1970	Pavitra Paapi	Kedarnath
1970	Samaj Ko Badal Dalo	Prakash
1970	Aansoo Aur Muskan	Mahesh
1971	Preet Ki Dori	Govind
1971	Lagan	Rajesh
1972	Shayar-e-Kashmir Mahjoor	Mahjoor
1974	Hindustan Ki Kasam	Rajesh
1975	Vandana	Rakesh
1976	Tapasya	Dr. Sagar Verma
1976	Kabhi Kabhie	Dr. R. P. Kapoor
1977	Mamta	Manish Srivastav
1977	Doosra Aadmi	Bhisham
1977	Sat Sri Akal, Punjabi movie	Pratima
1977	Prayashchit	
1977	Niyaz Aur Namaaz	
1977	Khel Kismat Ka	
1977	Jeevan Mukt	Satish Sharma
1977	Jallian Wala Bagh	Udham Singh
1977	Gyaniji	Preetam
1977	Duniyadari	Heera
1978	Ulahana	
1978	Udeekan	Teja Singh
1978	Vishwanath	Siddharth
1978	Anpadh	Dr. Anand
1978	Nawab Sahib	Shaukat Ali
1978	Muqaddar	Amar
1978	Kaala Aadmi	Aslam Khan
1978	Hamara Sansar	Pratap Sharma
1979	Shyamla	
1979	Kaala Patthar	Jagga
1979	Zulm Ki Pukar	
1980	Room No. 203	
1980	Humkadam	Shekhar Gupta
1980	Kasturi	Alkesh
1981	Agni Pareeksha	Siddharth Sharma
1981	Sameera	
1981	Nai Imarat	Yogendra
1982	Raaste Pyar Ke	Sohanlal Srivastav
1982	Suraag	Dr. Ajay Gupta
1982	Desh Premee	Ghulam Ali
1982	Waqt Ke Shehzade	Sardarji
1982	Bhai Aakhir Bhai Hota Hai	
1983	Lal Chunariya	Rajesh
1984	Boxer	Tony Braganza
1984	Teri Baahon Mein	
1984	Mera Faisla	Inspector Anand Saxena
1984	Andar Baahar	Inspector Ajay Sahni
1984	Jeene Nahi Doonga	Fakir Baba
1984	Nadaniyan	
1984	Jaag Utha Insan	Pujari
1985	Jawaab	Dinesh Mathur
1985	Ramkali	Jay Singh
1985	Ek Se Bhale Do	David D'Mello
1985	Meri Jung	Dr. Dinesh Mathur
1985	Mera Jawab	Arun
1985	Insaaf Main Karoonga	Inspector
1985	Shiva Ka Insaaf	Robert
1985	Haveli	Police Commissioner Thapa
1986	Mazloom	Judge Jaspal
1986	Maa Ki Saugandh	Surendra
1986	Insaaf Ki Awaaz	Police Commissioner
1986	Car Thief	Mr. Mehra
1987	Mr. X	Inspector Rakesh
1987	Hukumat	Shankardayal Singh
1987	Kalyug Aur Ramayan	Judge Shyam Diwakar
1987	Watan Ke Rakhwale	Assistant Jailor Madan
1987	Sher Shivaji	
1987	Dil Tujhko Diya	Ajay Sahni
1988	Subah Hone Tak	
1988	Zulm Ko Jala Doonga	Police Commissioner
1988	Vijay	Mr. Mehra
1989	Hal Aur Bandook	
1989	Dost Garibon Ka	Police Commissioner
1989	Marhi Da Deeva	Dharam Singh
1989	Galiyon Ka Badshah	Mr. Rana
1990	First Rank	Selection Committee Member
1991	Savdhan	
1991	Sau Crore	Advocate
1991	Phool Bane Angaray	Mr. Dutta
1992	Meera Ke Girdhar	
1992	Sooraj Mukhi	Mr. Kumar
1992	Aaj Ka Goonda Raaj	Amar
1992	Tahalka	General Sinha
1992	Waqt Ka Badshah	Hotel Owner
1992	Sangeet	Doctor
1992	Ajeeb Dastaan Hai Yeh	Advocate Jagatnarayan Sinha
1993	Police Wala	Inspector Rakeshnath
1993	In Custody	Mr. Siddiqui
1993	Kundan	Chief Minister
1993	Shaktiman	Superintendent Of Police
1993	Pyaar Ka Tarana	
1993	Pratimurti	
1994	Madhosh	
1994	Madam X	Police Commissioner Mathur
1994	Yuhi Kabhi	Judge
1995	Jeena Nahin Bin Tere	
1995	Vapsi Saajan Ki	
1995	Ab Insaf Hoga	Inspector Khan
1996	Sindoor Ki Holi	
1996	Yash	R. K. Joseph
1996	Chhota Sa Ghar	Dhanraj
1997	Share Bazaar	Karmyogi
1997	Saaz	Dr. Ranjeet Samant
1998	Angaar Vadee	
1998	Wajood	Abhijeet Joshi
2000	Choo Lenge Akash	
2001	Rahul	Dr. Bhandari
2001	Kasam	Jaswant Singh
2002	Pardesi Re	
2002	Yeh Mohabbat Hai	Bashir Khan
2002	Mere Yaar Ki Shaadi Hai	Rohan Khanna
2002	Mujhse Dosti Karoge	Mr. Verma
2003	Heda Hoda	
2005	Chakachak	
2005	Maa Where Are You...	Mr. Mohanto
2006	Jadu Saa Chal Gaya	Vilas
2006	Lage Raho Munna Bhai	Mr. D'Souza
2006	Umrao Jaan	Umrao's father
2007	Eklavya: The Royal Guard	Omkar Singh
2009	3 Idiots	Mr. Qureshi
2010	Dulha Mil Gaya	Ratandeep Kapoor
2010	Chance Pe Dance	Mr. Behl
2010	Right Yaaa Wrong	Dr. Siddiqui
2010	Dunno Y... Na Jaane Kyon	
2010	Malik Ek	Shankar
2011	Mere Brother Ki Dulhan	Colonel Agnihotri
2013	Boss	Raghunath
2013	Enemmy	Mr. Karmakar
2014	PK	Mr. Sahni (Jaggu's father)
2015	Hum Tum Dushman Dushman	
2015	Chooriyan	
2015	Uvaa	Presiding Judge
2016	Sultan	Gyan Singh Oberoi
2016	Desi Munde	Gurmukh Singh
2018	Paak	Sofiya's father
2019	One Day: Justice Delivered	Colonel
2019	Cypher	Nana
2019	Housefull 4	Maharaj Parikshitapdev Singh
2021	Hawayein	Mike Paul
2023	Dunki	

=== TV series ===
Year	Serial	Role	Notes
1984	The Far Pavilions	Mulraj	
1986	Katha Sagar	Multiple Roles in Multiple Episodes	
1986	Barrister Vinod	Barrister Vinod	
1987	Gul Gulshan Gulfaam		
1988	Mirza Ghalib	Nawab Shamsuddin	
1991–1992	Kahkashan	Josh Malihabadi	
1993	Commander		
1994	Junoon	Bharat Kumar Rajvansh	
1994	Chandrakanta	Maharaj Surendra Singh	
1994	The Great Maratha	Malhar Rao Holkar	
1994–1996	Ajnabi		
1998	Saturday Suspense - Beqasoor		
1998	Alpviram	Mr. Bakshi	
1998	Main Dilli Hoon	Maharaj Bharat	
1998-1999	Ashiqui	Anand Kumar	
1998–2003	Heena	Nawab Mirza	
1999	Tanha		
1999–2000	Gul Sanobar	Sultan of Hindustan	
2000–2001	Noorjahan	Mirza Ghiyas Beg	
2000	Hare Kanch Ki Chudian		Telefilm
	Gaatha		
2001	Jaane Anjaane	Mr. Vashisht	
2003	Shararat	Khushwant Mehra	
2004	Ana	Altaf	
2004-2005	Lal Kothi Alvida		
2004–2008	Saarrthi	Hemraj Goenka	
2007	Aahat - Shrunken Head		
2007-2008	Jersey No. 10		
2007-2008	Saat Phere: Saloni Ka Safar	Veer Singh	
2009	Kalpana		
2011-2012	Meri Maa		
2015–2017	Santoshi Mata	Raghavendra Mishra	
2019	Ek Bhram...Sarvagun Sampanna	Kishan Mittal	
