= Kalpana (supercomputer) =

Supercomputer operated by the NASA Advanced Supercomputing (NAS)

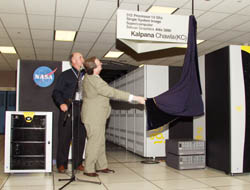
- NASA Ames Center Director G. Scott Hubbard unveils Kalpana. May 12, 2004.
- Active: 2003 - 2004
- Sponsors: NASA, USA
- Operators: NAS, SGI
- Location: NASA Advanced Supercomputing Division at NASA Ames Research Center
- Architecture: SGI Altix 3000, 512 Intel Itanium 2 processor SSI, Linux
- Operating system: SSI-Linux
- Legacy: Integrated into the Columbia supercomputer in July 2004.

Kalpana was a supercomputer at NASA Ames Research Center operated by the NASA Advanced Supercomputing (NAS) Division and named in honor of astronaut Kalpana Chawla, who was killed in the 2003 Space Shuttle Columbia disaster and had worked as an engineer at Ames Research Center prior to joining the Space Shuttle program. It was built in late 2003 and dedicated on May 12, 2004.

Kalpana was the world's first single-system image (SSI) Linux supercomputer, based on SGI's Altix 3000 architecture and 512 Intel Itanium 2 processors. It was originally built in a joint effort by the NASA Jet Propulsion Laboratory, Ames Research Center (AMC), and Goddard Space Flight Center to perform high-res ocean analysis with the ECCO (Estimating the Circulation and Climate of the Ocean) Consortium model. The supercomputer was "used to develop substantially more capable simulation models to better assess the evolution and behavior of the Earth's climate system," said NASA's Deputy Associate Administrator for Earth Science, Ghassem Asrar in 2004.

It served as one of several testbed systems NASA purchased to determine what architecture to proceed with for new supercomputing projects and lead to the purchase and construction of the Columbia supercomputer, named in honor of the STS-107 crew lost in 2003. In July 2004 the Kalpana system was integrated, as the first node, into the 20-node supercomputer.
