= Shadi Lal Koul =

Indian television actor

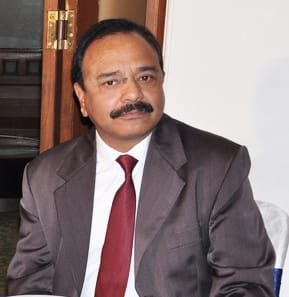
- Shadi Lal Koul in November 2018
- Born: 4 January 1954 (age 72); Srinagar, Jammu & Kashmir, India
- Died: 12 July 2020 (aged 66); Jammu, India
- Other names: Shamas ud Din,Nik lal, Nik Bub
- Occupations: comedian; television presenter
- Years active: 1974–2020
- Spouse: Lalita Koul
- Children: Shalini Koul; Vijay Koul; Late Ajay Koul
- Parents: Chana Koul (father); Satyawati Koul (mother)
- Family: Grandchildren : Yuvaan Koul, Vivaan Koul

Shadi Lal Koul (4 January 1954 – 12 July 2020) was a celebrated Indian actor and the most popular actor of Kashmir, whose name was recognized and admired by people of all generations. Widely regarded as one of the greatest comedians in the history of Kashmiri theatre and television, he was best known for his exceptional comic timing, expressive performances, and remarkable ability to connect with audiences. He was also famous for his dialogues such as "Begum salal tche kyazi goye malal," "gonaye wanye chakha bonaye," "Chaki pechni rass Yass poshi ta tass". He began his career in 1974, and has acted in more than Four hundred Kashmiri serials and Kashmiri plays. His skill and success earned him the informal title of being the "King of Comedy".

== Early life ==
Shadi Lal Koul was born on 4 January 1954 into a Kashmiri Pandit family in Chotta Bazar, Srinagar. His father was a businessman. Shadi lal was brought up in Chotta Bazar area of Habba Kadal in Srinagar.Shadi Lal Koul was the eldest son among three brothers and one sister. He lived a luxurious life during his childhood, but unfortunately, he lost his father at an early age while he was still studying. His father died due to a heart attack. After his father's death, the family faced many hardships. Shadi Lal Koul took up tutoring to support his family. Shadi lal Koul studied in Boys High school R.N Mandir till the 10th grade. He did his graduation from Amar Singh College.After completing his graduation he developed his career in theatre and acting. In 1974, he and Abdul Rahim Kuchay founded Yasmeen Dramatic Club. He also founded Kali Das Theatre with his friend Dr.Ayash Arif, which is one of the oldest theatre groups of Kashmir.

== Career ==
His first play was Yi Janam Ti Su Janam directed by Jai Kishan Zutshi. The Tassruf play in 1975 bagged him his first best actor award. He also appeared in Tratte Buzun, Laash Ghar, Dastar, Cactus, Guributh, Local Taxes Extra, Ye zanam su zanam, Machama, Tasruff, Out of Date, Zaher, Bi chaddath ni, Zalur, Premnath vs Premnath etc.

In the 1980s, he became a household name through the TV series Shabrang, which appeared from 1981 to 1983. His other hit television serials included Rangan Heund Rang, Cherry Treuch, Ghulam Begum Baadshah, Tijarratuk Aasan Tarikaa, Gaash Innuss Taam, Rustam Gota, Aadam Zaat, Pagah Sholi Duniya, Jatti Wanai, Pazar Yli Mood, Halyan Banan Wukir Thana, Gash Pholnas Taam, Trate Buzun, Naav Dar Aab, Yeli Tohiy Badliv Teli Soocho, Wazir-e- Nazar Guzar and Amaar .

He acted in Kashmiri movie Inqalab.

He also acted in two Hindi serials Gul Gulshan Gulfaam and Katha Sagar, which were broadcast on national television.

== Personal life ==
Shadi Lal Koul was married to Lalita Koul in 1980. They have two sons, Ajay Koul and Vijay Koul and a daughter Shalini Koul. His older son, Ajay Koul, died of cancer at age 18. Shadi Lal Koul was diagnosed with multiple myeloma in 2016 and underwent chemotherapy.

== Awards and honours ==
Year	Award Ceremony
2005	Jehlum Art Media Award
2007	J&K Sadiq Memorial Award
2011	The Jammu Kashmir Film Makers And Artists Co-Operation Ltd.
2014	The Kashmir Education Culture & Science Society, New Delhi
2016	J&K Gaurav Samman
2021	J&K State Award
2021	Harmony India Award (Shrestha Samman)

== Death ==
It was reported in the media on 12 July 2020 that his cancer had relapsed for the second time since 2016 and that he had been hospitalised for six days. He died, in coma, at 2.45 am IST at his residence Durga Nagar, Bantalab, Jammu. He was cremated at Bantalab crematorium in Jammu the same day.
