= Kalpana (TV series) =

- Genre: Drama
- Created by: Balraj Sahni Productions
- Directed by: Parikshet Sahni
- Starring: see below
- Opening theme: "Kalpana" by
- Country of origin: India
- Original language: Hindi
- No. of seasons: 1
- No. of episodes: Varies

Production
- Producers: Parikshet Sahni; Aneesh Dev
- Camera setup: Multi-camera
- Running time: Approx. 25 minutes

Original release
- Network: DD National
- Release: 15 February 2009 – present

Kalpana is an Indian television series of DD National channel, based on the story of a girl who supports her family, especially her drunkard father through her talent of singing. Besides, the series is noted as one of the popular television shows of Doordarshan network, and has received 4.22 TVR rating from its third episode.

== Cast ==
- Ekta Saraiya ... Kalpana
- Parikshit Sahni
- Kuldeep Dubey
- Suresh Chatwal
- Brij Sawhney
