= Kalpana (imagination) =

Kalpanā (Sanskrit: कल्पना) is derived from the root - kalpanama (कल्पनम्) + ना, and means – 'fixing', 'settlement', 'making', 'performing', 'doing', 'forming', 'arranging', 'decorating', 'ornamenting', 'forgery', 'a contrivance', 'device'. and also means – 'assuming anything to be real', 'fictional'.

Suresvaracharya in his Taittirīyavārttika (commentary on Śankāra's work on the Taittirīya Upanişad) (II.297) has used the term kalpanā to mean – 'inferior conception'. Vishnu Purana (VI.vii.90) and Naradiya Purana (lxvii.70) define kalpanā as a two-termed relation which is a distinction between the contemplation and the object-to-be-contemplated.

Badarayana has used the word kalpanā only once in his composition, Brahma Sutras, but while translating Sri Govinda Bhāshya of Baladeva Vidyabhushana, a commentary on Vedānta sutras, this word has been translated by Srisa Chandra Vasu to mean – 'the creative power of thought, formation, creation (and not imagination) ', which meaning is in the context of explaining Pradhana purported to have been referred to by the word - ajā (birthless entity) occurring in the Shvetashvatara Upanishad (IV.5). Badarayana states:-

कल्पनोपदेशाच च, मध्वादिवदविरोधः |

"Because it is taught that Pradhana is the creation of the Lord, so there is no contradiction in calling her both created and uncreated, as in the case of honey (a reference to Madhu-vidya)."

Roer in his translation of the commentary of Shankara on Brihadaranyaka Upanishad has translated the word kalpanā as 'fictitious view', and upadhi , as 'fictitious attribute'. Shankara in his Brahma Sutra Bhāsya has interpreted this sutra as follows:-

"And since this is an instruction in the form of an imagery, just as in the case of honey etc., therefore there is no incongruity." (Translated by Swami Gambhirananda)

explaining that the word ajā neither indicates the form of a she-goat nor has it been used in the derivative sense of that which is unborn; what is said by the Shvetashvatara Upanishad is as an instruction about the material source of all things – moving and immobile, using a form of imagery (kalpanā) - the analogy to a she-goat.

Dignāga in his Pramāna-samuccya, tells us that amongst pratyaksha ('perception') that has the particular for the object and anumāna ('inference') that has only the universal cognisance, the former ('perception') is free from kalpanā or 'conceptual construction'. Katha Upanishad tells us that virtual objects exist only during kalpanā-kāla i.e. during the period of imagination, owing to avidyā . And, according to Patanjali, kalpanā ('fancy') is more subjective than illusion and hallucination.

Man is able to think because he has a perceiving and arranging manas ('mind') which self-illuminated gives him chetnā ('consciousness') and the faculties of pratyaksha ('perception'), chintā ('thought'), kalpanā ('imagination'), prayatna ('volition') and chaitanya ('higher sentience and intelligence'). The Vedic thinkers held the view that the universe is merely an idea, a kalpanā ('phantasm') or projection of the mind of the creator; even the experience of birth and death by the Jiva is a kalpanā ('hallucination') created by ignorance. Mental kalpanā is false superimposition on account of ignorance. However, the siddha , exclusively intent on attaining yoga with own self, and self-reliant, gains powers arising spontaneously as devoid of any ruse or ploy (kalpanā).
