= NAS Parallel Benchmarks =

- Original author(s): NASA Numerical Aerodynamic Simulation Program
- Developer(s): NASA Advanced Supercomputing Division
- Initial release: 1991
- Stable release: 3.4
- Website: nas.nasa.gov/Software/NPB/

NAS Parallel Benchmarks (NPB) are a set of benchmarks targeting performance evaluation of highly parallel supercomputers. They are developed and maintained by the NASA Advanced Supercomputing (NAS) Division (formerly the NASA Numerical Aerodynamic Simulation Program) based at the NASA Ames Research Center. NAS solicits performance results for NPB from all sources.

== History ==
=== Motivation ===
Traditional benchmarks that existed before NPB, such as the Livermore loops, the LINPACK Benchmark and the NAS Kernel Benchmark Program, were usually specialized for vector computers. They generally suffered from inadequacies including parallelism-impeding tuning restrictions and insufficient problem sizes, which rendered them inappropriate for highly parallel systems. Equally unsuitable were full-scale application benchmarks due to high porting cost and unavailability of automatic software parallelization tools. As a result, NPB were developed in 1991 and released in 1992 to address the ensuing lack of benchmarks applicable to highly parallel machines.

=== NPB 1 ===
The first specification of NPB recognized that the benchmarks should feature

- new parallel-aware algorithmic and software methods,
- genericness and architecture neutrality,
- easy verifiability of correctness of results and performance figures,
- capability of accommodating new systems with increased power,
- and ready distributability.

In the light of these guidelines, it was deemed the only viable approach to use a collection of "paper-and-pencil" benchmarks that specified a set of problems only algorithmically and left most implementation details to the implementer's discretion under certain necessary limits.

NPB 1 defined eight benchmarks, each in two problem sizes dubbed Class A and Class B. Sample codes written in Fortran 77 were supplied. They used a small problem size Class S and were not intended for benchmarking purposes.

=== NPB 2 ===
Since its release, NPB 1 displayed two major weaknesses. Firstly, due to its "paper-and-pencil" specification, computer vendors usually highly tuned their implementations so that their performance became difficult for scientific programmers to attain. Secondly, many of these implementation were proprietary and not publicly available, effectively concealing their optimizing techniques. Secondly, problem sizes of NPB 1 lagged behind the development of supercomputers as the latter continued to evolve.

NPB 2, released in 1996, came with source code implementations for five out of eight benchmarks defined in NPB 1 to supplement but not replace NPB 1. It extended the benchmarks with an up-to-date problem size Class C. It also amended the rules for submitting benchmarking results. The new rules included explicit requests for output files as well as modified source files and build scripts to ensure public availability of the modifications and reproducibility of the results.

NPB 2.2 contained implementations of two more benchmarks. NPB 2.3 of 1997 was the first complete implementation in MPI. It shipped with serial versions of the benchmarks consistent with the parallel versions and defined a problem size Class W for small-memory systems. NPB 2.4 of 2002 offered a new MPI implementation and introduced another still larger problem size Class D. It also augmented one benchmark with I/O-intensive subtypes.

=== NPB 3 ===
NPB 3 retained the MPI implementation from NPB 2 and came in more flavors, namely OpenMP, Java and High Performance Fortran. These new parallel implementations were derived from the serial codes in NPB 2.3 with additional optimizations. NPB 3.1 and NPB 3.2 added three more benchmarks, which, however, were not available across all implementations; NPB 3.3 introduced a Class E problem size. Based on the single-zone NPB 3, a set of multi-zone benchmarks taking advantage of the MPI/OpenMP hybrid programming model were released under the name NPB-Multi-Zone (NPB-MZ) for "testing the effectiveness of multi-level and hybrid parallelization paradigms and tools".

== The benchmarks ==
As of NPB 3.3, eleven benchmarks are defined as summarized in the following table.

| Benchmark | Name derived from | Available since | Description | Remarks |
|---|---|---|---|---|
| MG | MultiGrid | NPB 1 | Approximate the solution to a three-dimensional discrete Poisson equation using the V-cycle multigrid method | |
| CG | Conjugate Gradient | NPB 1 | Estimate the smallest eigenvalue of a large sparse symmetric positive-definite matrix using the inverse iteration with the conjugate gradient method as a subroutine for solving systems of linear equations | |
| FT | Fast Fourier Transform | NPB 1 | Solve a three-dimensional partial differential equation (PDE) using the fast Fourier transform (FFT) | |
| IS | Integer Sort | NPB 1 | Sort small integers using the bucket sort | |
| EP | Embarrassingly Parallel | NPB 1 | Generate independent Gaussian random variates using the Marsaglia polar method | |
| BT | Block Tridiagonal | NPB 1 | Solve a synthetic system of nonlinear PDEs using three different algorithms involving block tridiagonal, scalar pentadiagonal and symmetric successive over-relaxation (SSOR) solver kernels, respectively | The BT benchmark has I/O-intensive subtypes; All three benchmarks have multi-zone versions |
| SP | Scalar Pentadiagonal | NPB 1 | Solve a synthetic system of nonlinear PDEs using three different algorithms involving block tridiagonal, scalar pentadiagonal and symmetric successive over-relaxation (SSOR) solver kernels, respectively | The BT benchmark has I/O-intensive subtypes; All three benchmarks have multi-zone versions |
| LU | Lower-Upper symmetric Gauss-Seidel | NPB 1 | Solve a synthetic system of nonlinear PDEs using three different algorithms involving block tridiagonal, scalar pentadiagonal and symmetric successive over-relaxation (SSOR) solver kernels, respectively | The BT benchmark has I/O-intensive subtypes; All three benchmarks have multi-zone versions |
| UA | Unstructured Adaptive | NPB 3.1 | Solve Heat equation with convection and diffusion from moving ball. Mesh is adaptive and recomputed at every 5th step. | |
| DC | Data Cube operator | NPB 3.1 | | |
| DT | Data Traffic | NPB 3.2 | | |
