= Kalpana (poetry) =

Poetry book by Rabindranath Tagore

- Author: Rabindranath Tagore
- Language: Bengali
- Genre: poetry
- Published: 1900
- Publication place: India

Kalpana (Bengali: কল্পনা; English: Imagination) is a famous Bengali language poetry book written by Rabindranath Tagore. It was published in 1900. It consists of 49 poems. He had included 1 poem of "Kalpana" in his Nobel Prize winning work Song Offerings.

== Dedication ==
Tagore dedicated the book to Shrishchandra Majumder. He was Tagore's friend.

== List of poems ==
The poems of "Kalpana" include:

1. Chourapanchashika
2. Madanbhasmer purbe
3. Madanbhasmer par
4. Spardha
5. Bhrasta lagna
6. Bangalakhhi
7. Bhikhhayang noiba noiba cha
8. Se amar janani re
9. Jachana
10. Nababiraha
11. Manaspratima
12. Sakaruna
13. Prakash
14. Biday
15. Asomoy
16. Boishakh
17. Janmadiner gaan
18. Duhsomoy
19. Swapna
20. Marjana
21. Piyasi
22. Pranayprashna
23. Sharat
24. Hatabhagyer gaan
25. Jagadishchandra Basu
26. Biday
27. Lajjita
28. Sankoch
29. Bibahamangal
30. Unnatilakhhan
31. Borshashes
32. Basanta
33. Ratri
34. Purnakam
35. Chaitrarajani
36. Pasarini
37. Asha
38. Matar ahaban
39. Juta-abhishkar
40. Bhikari
41. Lila
42. Kalpanik
43. Prarthi
44. Bharatlakhhi
45. Ashes
46. Jharer dine
47. Bhagna mandir
48. Anabachinna Ami
49. Parinam
