= Chinta (mentation) =

Mental activity in Hindu philosophy

- Samkhya: Kapila
- Yoga: Patanjali
- Vaisheshika: Kaṇāda, Prashastapada
- Secular: Valluvar

Chinta (Sanskrit: चिन्ता) in Hindu philosophy refers to mentation i.e. mental activity, especially thinking.

== Meaning ==
The word, Chintā (चिन्ता) is derived from the root – चिन्त् meaning - to think, consider, reflect, ponder over; and by itself means – thinking, thought, sad or sorrowful thought, reflection, consideration, anxiety.

== Nature ==
Chintā is one of thirty-three Vyabhichāri bhavas, the transient feelings which rise irregularly and support the permanent basic sentiments, because of their fleeting nature they are also called sanchāri bhavas. Manas, which is the ordinary mental equipment of the individual, is the perceiving and arranging mind. In Samkhya system it refers to the personal organ of thought, not diffused like theātman but localized in the individual. Manas has its own illumination (chetas) which gives man awareness or consciousness (chetna), faculties of perception (pratyaksha), thought (chintā), imagination (kalpanā) and volition (praytana). Chintā is the faculty whereby the current of thought dwells, thinks and contemplates upon the subject so recalled by Samarnam (memory), and previously known and determined by buddhi (intellect)

== Implication ==
Rishi Shant Vaikhānsa of the Rig Veda (IX.66.25) in a mantra addressed to Soma tells us that

पवमानस्य जङ्घ्नतो हरेश्चन्द्रा असृक्षत |
जीरा अजिराशोचिषः ||

when the material darkness is dispelled by the powerful purifying (पवमानस्य) light emanating from the divine source, coinciding therewith is also the destruction of the darkness of the mind (जङ्घ्नतः) (which darkness is ignorance), then that light (जीराः) (the bright divine source) which is Brahman (अजिराशोचिषः) is seen which delivers the yogins beyond all (imaginable) folds (barriers) of existence, which existence with reference to the body is gross but is subtle with reference to the mind. The epithet – Soma as the ever glowing one, is used with regard to Agni, Aditya and Brahman.

Sankara in his Vivekachudamani (Sloka 539) uses the term – चिन्ताशून्यम् (chintashoonyam) as meaning without anxiety or worry (chinta here means anxiety). Chinmayananda Saraswati explains that it refers to the man of perfection to whom no thought comes to mind so as to disturb and destroy him because worry cannot reach him who refuses to worry.

In Vedanta, Chinta, along with and therefore interconnected with vāsanā and karma, is a factor which represents the chain of causation. Chinta and karmas create powerful vasanas and by themselves are the effects of vasanas. Vasanas are not destroyed if chinta and karmas are not destroyed.

== Significance ==
Gaudapada in his Karika on the Mandukya Upanishad (Slokas III.31-48) explains that all that there is, is perceived by the mind; when the mind ceases to be (stops thinking) duality is not perceived; the mind ceases to think as a consequence of the realisation of the Truth that it is the Self, it becomes a non-perceiver. Truth is known through knowledge and both are birth-less; the mind that does not lose itself when under control becomes the fearless Brahman possessed of the light of Consciousness; then all mentation (चिन्ता) stops, he states:-

सर्वभिलापविगतः सर्वचिन्तासमुत्थितः |
सुप्रशान्तः सकृज्ज्योतिः समाधिरलोऽभयः ||

" The Self is free of all sense-organs, and is above all internal organs. It is supremely tranquil, eternal effulgence, divine absorption, immutable, and fearless. "

In this verse, the word chinta derived in the sense of that by which things are thought of, means - the intellect. Gaudapada calls the moment of direct apprehension of the Paramatman (whose presence is known through the mind) the state of the highest Samadhi in which all talk is at an end, all anxiety is at an end. The learned people are those who are aware of the existence of Truth, and the enlightened one are those who have in their own way personally experienced, both know about the true nature of Truth.
