= SGI Altix =

Supercomputer family

- Manufacturer: Silicon Graphics, Inc.
- Type: Server, supercomputer
- Released: January 7, 2003
- Discontinued: 2011
- Operating system: Linux, Microsoft Windows
- CPU: Itanium 2, Xeon
- Memory: 2 GB to 192 TB
- Connectivity: USB
- Predecessor: Origin 300
- Related: SGI Prism, SGI Virtu
- Website: http://www.sgi.com/products/servers/altix/ Archived 2005-12-12 at the Wayback Machine

Altix is a line of server computers and supercomputers produced by Silicon Graphics (and successor company Silicon Graphics International), based on Intel processors. It succeeded the MIPS/IRIX-based Origin 3000 servers.

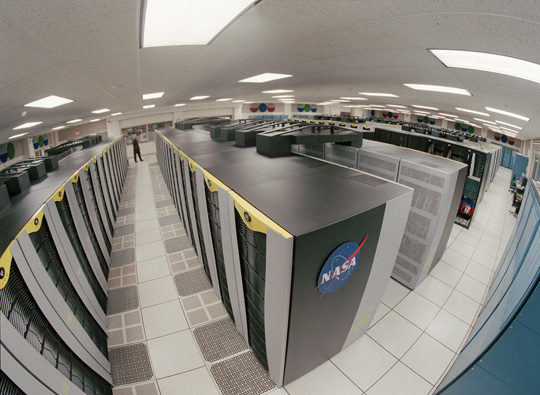
The Columbia supercomputer was based on Altix products.

== History ==
The line was first announced on January 7, 2003, with the Altix 3000 series, based on Intel Itanium 2 processors and SGI's NUMAlink processor interconnect. At product introduction, the system supported up to 64 processors running Linux as a single system image and shipped with a Linux distribution called SGI Advanced Linux Environment, which was compatible with Red Hat Advanced Server.

By August 2003, many SGI Altix customers were running Linux on 128- and 256-processor SGI Altix systems. SGI officially announced 256-processor support within a single system image of Linux on March 10, 2004, using a 2.4-based Linux kernel. The SGI Advanced Linux Environment was eventually dropped after support using a standard, unmodified SUSE Linux Enterprise Server (SLES) distribution for SGI Altix was provided with SLES 8 and SLES 9.

Later, SGI Altix 512-processor systems were officially supported using an unmodified, standard Linux distribution with the launch of SLES 9 SP1. Besides full support of SGI Altix on SUSE Linux Enterprise Server, a standard and unmodified Red Hat Enterprise Linux was also fully supported starting with SGI Altix 3700 Bx2 with RHEL 4 and RHEL 5 with system processor limits defined by Red Hat for those releases.

On November 14, 2005, SGI introduced the Altix 4000 series based on the Itanium 2. The Altix 3000 and 4000 are distributed shared memory multiprocessors. SGI later officially supported 1024-processor systems on an unmodified, standard Linux distribution with the launch of SLES 10 in July 2006. SGI Altix 4700 was also officially supported by Red Hat with RHEL 4 and RHEL 5 — maximum processor limits were as defined by Red Hat for its RHEL releases.

The Altix brand was used for systems based on multi-core Intel Xeon processors. These include the Altix XE rackmount servers, Altix ICE blade servers and Altix UV supercomputers.

NASA's Columbia supercomputer, installed in 2004 and decommissioned in 2013, was a 10240-microprocessor cluster of twenty Altix 3000 systems, each with 512 microprocessors, interconnected with InfiniBand.

== Altix 3000 ==
The Altix 3000 is the first generation of Altix systems. It was succeeded by the Altix 4000 in 2004, and the last model was discontinued on December 31, 2006.

The Altix 330 is an entry-level server. Unlike the high-end models, the Altix 330 is not "brick" based, but is instead based on 1U-high compute modules mounted in a rack and connected with NUMAlink. A single system may contain 1 to 16 Itanium 2 processors and 2 to 128 GB of memory.

The Altix 1330 is a cluster of Altix 330 systems. The systems are networked with Gigabit Ethernet or 4X InfiniBand.

The Altix 350 is a mid-range model that supports up to 32 Itanium 2 processors. Introduced in 2005, it runs Linux, rather than SGI's own Unix variant, IRIX. The Altix 350 is scalable from one to thirty-two 64-bit Intel Itanium processors. It features DDR SDRAM and PCI-X expansion ports, and can support SCSI or SATA internal hard drives. Designed as a rack-mount server, the Altix 350 is 2U, meaning it occupies two slots vertically in a standard server rack. The Altix 1350 is a cluster of Altix 350 systems.

As of December 2006, the Altix 350 was superseded by the Altix 450 (based on the Itanium 2) and the Altix XE (based on the Xeon).

The Altix 3300 is a mid-range model supporting 4 to 12 processors and 2 to 48 GB of memory. It is packaged in a short (17U) rack.

The Altix 3700 is a high-end model supporting 16 to 512 processors and 8 GB to 2 TB of memory. It requires one or multiple tall (39U) rack (s). A variant of the Altix 3000 with graphics capability is known as the Prism.

The 3700 is based on the third generation NUMAflex distributed shared memory architecture and it uses the NUMAlink 4 interconnection fabric. The Altix 3000 supports a single system image of 64 processors. If there are more than 64 processors in a system, then the system must be partitioned.

The basic building block is called a C-brick, which contains two nodes in a 4U high rackmount unit. Each node contains two Intel Itanium 2 processors that connect to the Super-Bedrock application-specific integrated circuit through a single front-side bus. The Super-Bedrock is a crossbar switch for the processors, the local RAM, the network interface and the I/O interface. The two Super-Bedrock ASICs in each brick are connected internally by a single 6.4 GB/s NUMAlink 4 channel. A processor node also contains 16 DIMM slots that accept standard DDR DIMMs with capacities of 4 to 16 GB.

The Altix 3700 Bx2 is a high-end model supporting 16 to 2,048 Itanium 2 processors and 12 GB to 24 TB of memory. It requires one or multiple tall (40U) racks.

== Altix 4000 ==
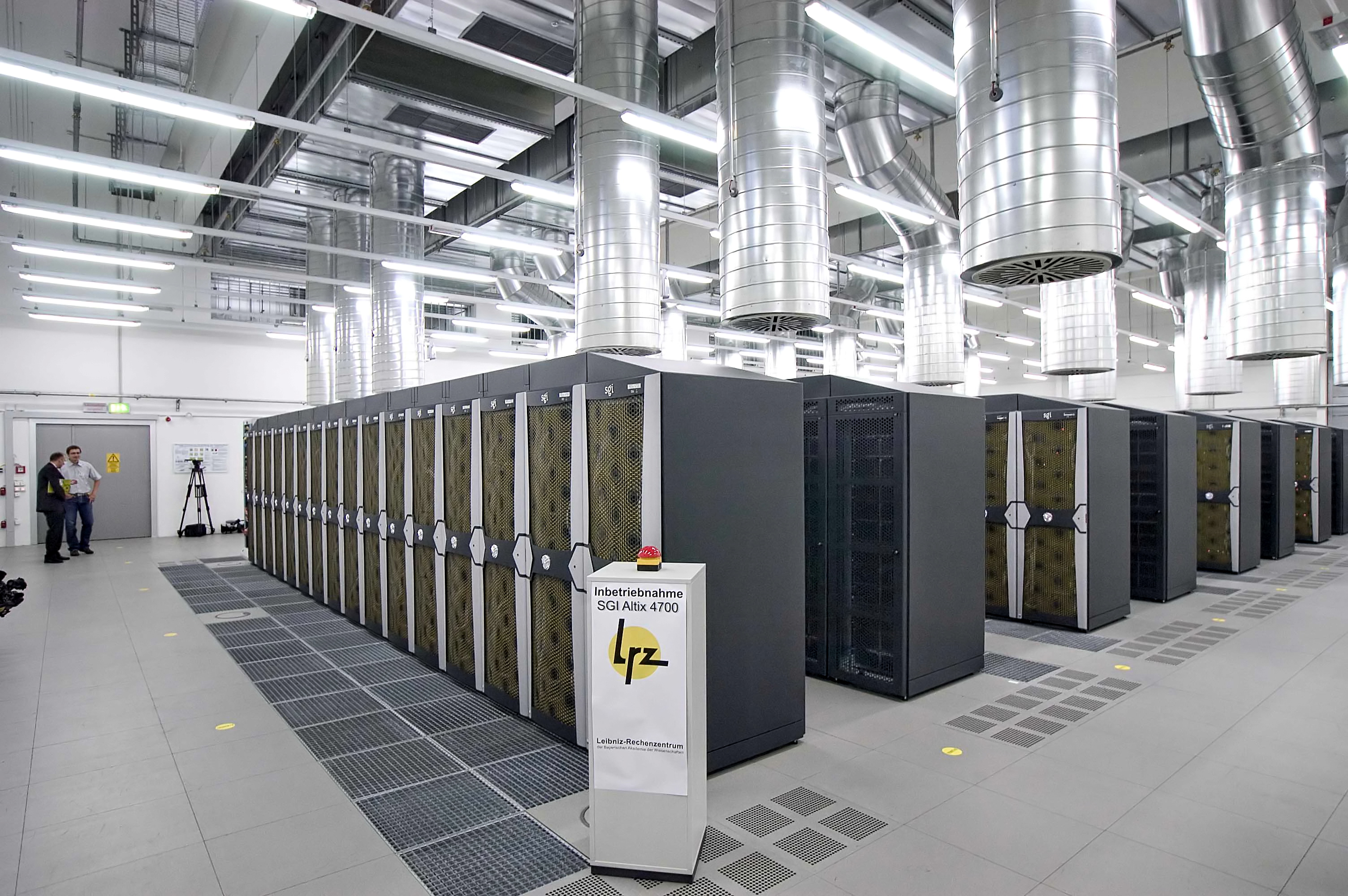
SGI Altix 4700 machines in the Höchstleistungsrechner Bayern II

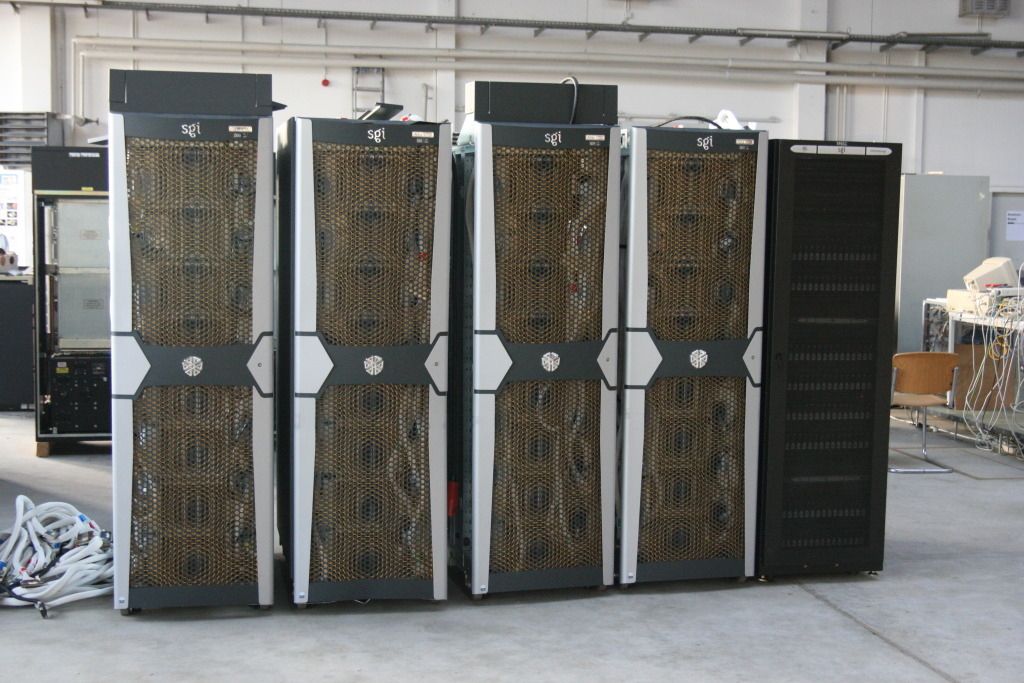
Altix 4700 - 4x node racks, 1x storage rack

The Altix 4000 is the next Itanium-based product line. It has two models, the Altix 450 a mid-range server, and the Altix 4700 a high-end server.

An Altix 4700 system contains up to 2048 dual-core Itanium 2 and Itanium ("Montvale" revision) microprocessor sockets, connected by the NUMAlink 4 interconnect in a fat tree network topology. The microprocessors are accompanied by up to 128 TB of memory (192 TB with single microprocessor socket blades and 16 GB DIMMs).

Each node is contained within a blade that plugs into an enclosure, the individual rack unit (IRU). The IRU is a 10U enclosure that contains the necessary components to support the blades such as the power supplies, two router boards (one for every five blades) and a L1 controller. Each IRU can support ten single-wide blades or two double-wide blades and eight single-width blades. The IRUs are mounted in 42U-high rack, and each rack supports up to four IRUs.

Two types of node, processor and memory, are contained within a blade. Compute blades contain a processor node and consist of two PAC611 sockets for Itanium 2 and Itanium microprocessors, a Super-Hub (SHub) application-specific integrated circuit (ASIC) (chipset) and eight dual in-line memory module (DIMM) slots for memory. The number of microprocessor sockets in a compute blade is one or two. One-processor socket configurations provide more bandwidth as only one microprocessor socket is using the front side bus and local memory. Two-processor socket configurations do not support hyperthreading. Memory blades are used to expand the amount of memory without increasing the number of processors. They contain a SHub ASIC and 12 DIMM slots. Both compute and memory blades support 1, 2 4, 8, and 16 GB DIMMs. SGI support does not support any installations with 16 GB DIMMs.

Multiple servers can be combined on the same Numalink fabric up to the theoretical maximum of 8,192 nodes (16,384 OS CPUs).

== Altix XE ==
The Altix XE servers use Intel Xeon x86-64-architecture processors. Models include:

- The Altix XE210 server supports up to two Dual or Quad-Core Intel Xeon processors, 5100 Series or 5300 series, 32 GB DDR2 667 MHz FBDIMM memory, 1 x PCIe x8 (low profile) and 1 x PCI-X 133 MHz (full height) PCI slots, and Three SATA/SAS drive bays.
- The Altix XE240 server supports up to two Dual or Quad-Core Intel Xeon processors, 5100 Series or 5300 series, 32 GB DDR2 667 MHz FBDIMM memory, two PCI slots configuration options (option 1: 2 x PCIe x4 (low profile), 2 x PCIe x4 (full height), 1 x PCEe x8 (full height); or option 2: 2 x PCIe x4 (low profile), 3 x PCI-X 133 MHz (full height), 1 x PCI-X 133 MHz (full height), and Five SATA/SAS drive bays.
- The Altix XE250 server
- The Altix XE270 server is a 2U configuration with Intel Xeon processor 5500 series, with a choice of up to 18 DDR3 DIMMs (2 GB, 4 GB, or 8 GB DIMMs), 2 x PCIe x8 gen 2 (low profile), 1 x PCIe x4 gen 1 (low profile), 2 x PCI-x 133/100 (low profile) PCI slots, eight SATA or SAS drive bays with optional hardware RAID (0, 1, 5, 6, 10),
- The Altix XE310 server was introduced January 8, 2007 and contains two nodes per XE310, up to four Dual or Quad-Core Intel Xeon processors, 5100 Series or 5300 series (two per node), 64 GB DDR2 667 MHz FBDIMM memory (32 GB per node), 2 x PCIe x8 (1 per node) PCI slots, and Four SATA/SAS drive bays (two per node).
- The Altix XE320 server
- The Altix XE340 server contains 2 compute nodes within a 1U configuration, Intel Xeon processor 5500 series, Choice of up to 12 DDR3 DIMMs per node (2 GB, 4 GB, or 8 GB DIMMs), 2 x PCIe x16 (1 per node) - low profile PCI slot, and Four SATA drive bays (2 per node) with optional SAS and hardware RAID 0, 1.
- The Altix XE500 server is a 3U configuration with Intel Xeon processor 5500 series, with a choice of up to 18 DDR3 DIMMs (2 GB, 4 GB, or 8 GB DIMMs), 2 x PCIe x16 gen2 (full height) and 4 x PCIe x8 gen2 (full height) PCI slots, and Eight SATA or SAS drives with optional hardware RAID (0, 1, 5, 6, 10).
- The Altix XE1200 cluster
- The Altix XE1300 cluster

All Altix XE systems support Novell SUSE Linux Enterprise Server, Red Hat Enterprise Linux, and Microsoft Windows. VMware support was added across the Altix XE product line.

== Altix ICE ==
The Altix ICE blade platform is an Intel Xeon-based system featuring diskless compute blades and a Hierarchical Management Framework (HMF) for scalability, performance, and resiliency. While the earlier Itanium-based Altix systems run a single-system image (SSI) Linux kernel on 1024 processors or more using a standard SuSE Linux Enterprise Server (SLES) distribution, the Altix ICE's clustering capabilities use standard SLES or Red Hat Enterprise Linux distributions and scale to over 51,200 cores on NASA's Pleiades supercomputer.

The Altix ICE 8200LX blade enclosure features two 4x DDR IB switch blade and one high-performing plane, and the Altix ICE 8200EX features four 4x DDR IB switch blades, and two high-performing planes. Both configurations support either hypercube or fat tree topology, and 16 compute blades within an IRU.

The IP-83 and IP-85 compute blades support Intel Xeon 5200 or 5400 Series processors, and the IP-95 compute blade support Intel Xeon 5500 Series processors.

In November 2011 the ICE 8400 is based on either Intel Xeon 5500 or 5600 processors or the AMD Opteron 6100 series processors.

As of 2013, these use the Xeon Phi coprocessors.

== Altix UV ==
The Altix UV supercomputer architecture was announced in November 2009. Codenamed Ultraviolet during development, the Altix UV combines a development of the NUMAlink interconnect used in the Altix 4000 (NUMAlink 5) with quad-, six- or eight-core "Nehalem-EX" Intel Xeon 7500 processors. Altix UV systems run either SuSE Linux Enterprise Server or Red Hat Enterprise Linux, and scale from 32 to 2,048 cores with support for up to 16 terabytes (TB) of shared memory in a single system image.

In 2010 and 2011, SGI retired the Altix name for new servers produced by the company. Altix UV and Altix ICE have been shortened to "SGI UV" and "SGI ICE," while the Altix XE line is named "Rackable."
