= AlphaServer =

Series of server computers

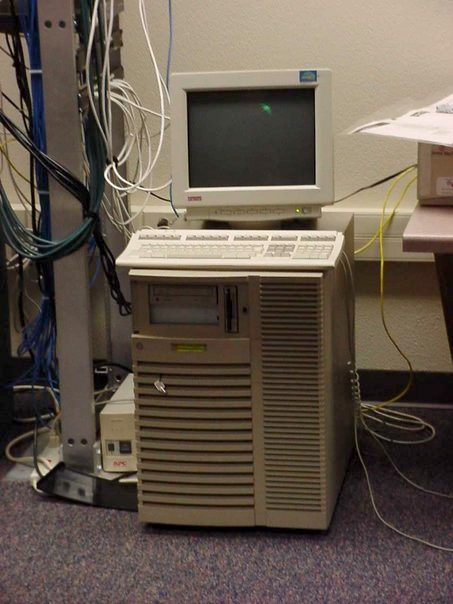
- AlphaServer 2000 running Red Hat Linux
- Developer: DEC (1994–1998); Compaq (1998–2002); HP (2002–2007)
- Type: Server
- Released: 1994
- Discontinued: 27 April 2007
- CPU: DEC Alpha

AlphaServer is a series of server computers, produced from 1994 onwards by Digital Equipment Corporation, and later by Compaq and HP. AlphaServers were based on the DEC Alpha 64-bit microprocessor. Supported operating systems for AlphaServers are Tru64 UNIX (formerly Digital UNIX), OpenVMS, MEDITECH MAGIC and Windows NT (on earlier systems, with AlphaBIOS ARC firmware), while enthusiasts have provided alternative operating systems such as Linux, NetBSD, OpenBSD and FreeBSD.

The Alpha processor was also used in a line of workstations, AlphaStation.

Some AlphaServer models were rebadged in white enclosures as Digital Servers for the Windows NT server market. These so-called "white box" models comprised the following:

- Digital Server 3300/3305: rebadged AlphaServer 800
- Digital Server 5300/5305: rebadged AlphaServer 1200
- Digital Server 7300/7305/7310: rebadged AlphaServer 4100

As part of the roadmap to phase out Alpha-, MIPS- and PA-RISC-based systems in favor of Itanium-based systems at HP, the most recent AlphaServer systems reached their end of general availability on 27 April 2007. The availability of upgrades and options was discontinued on 25 April 2008, approximately one year after the systems were discontinued.

== Models ==
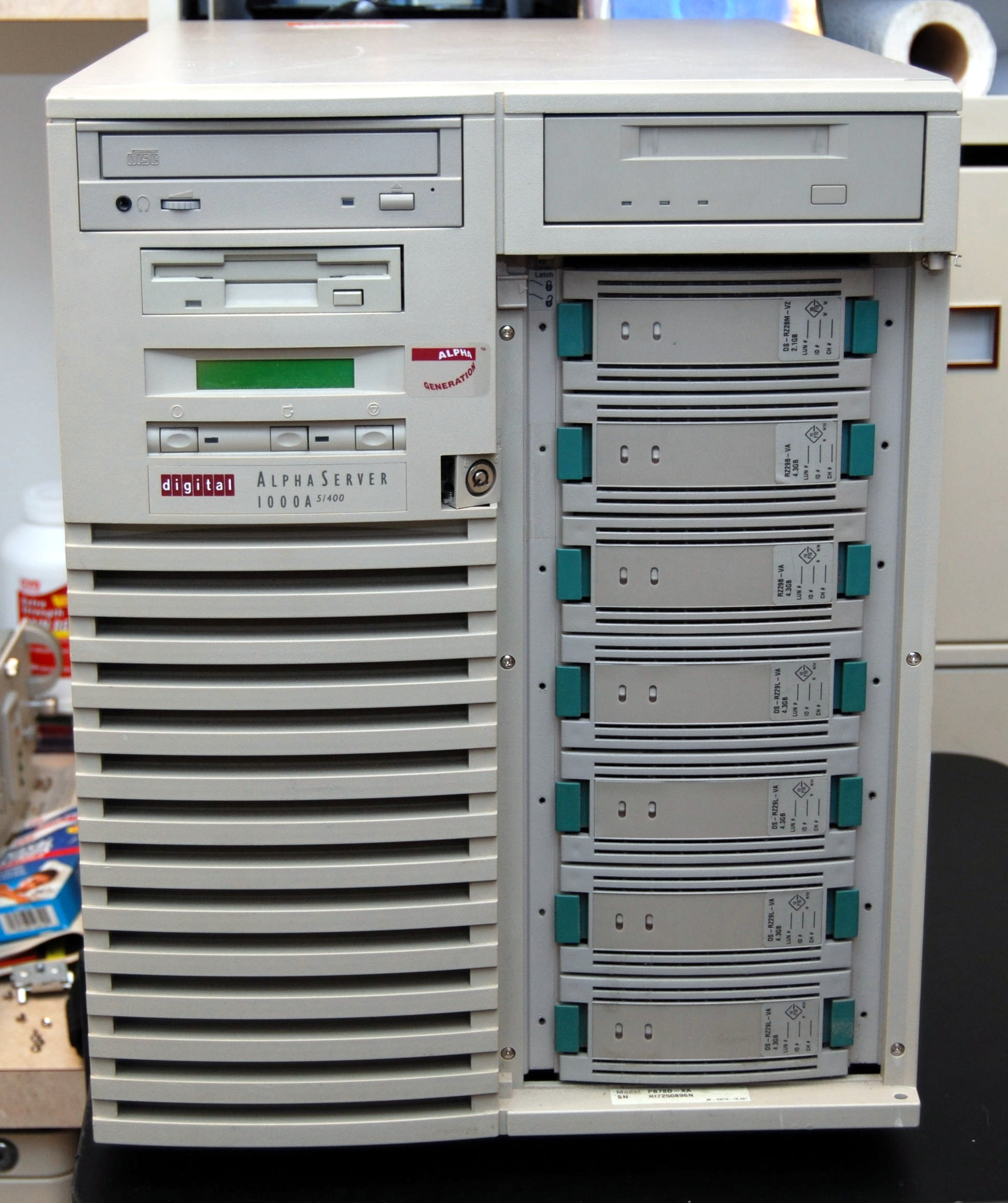
AlphaServer 1000A

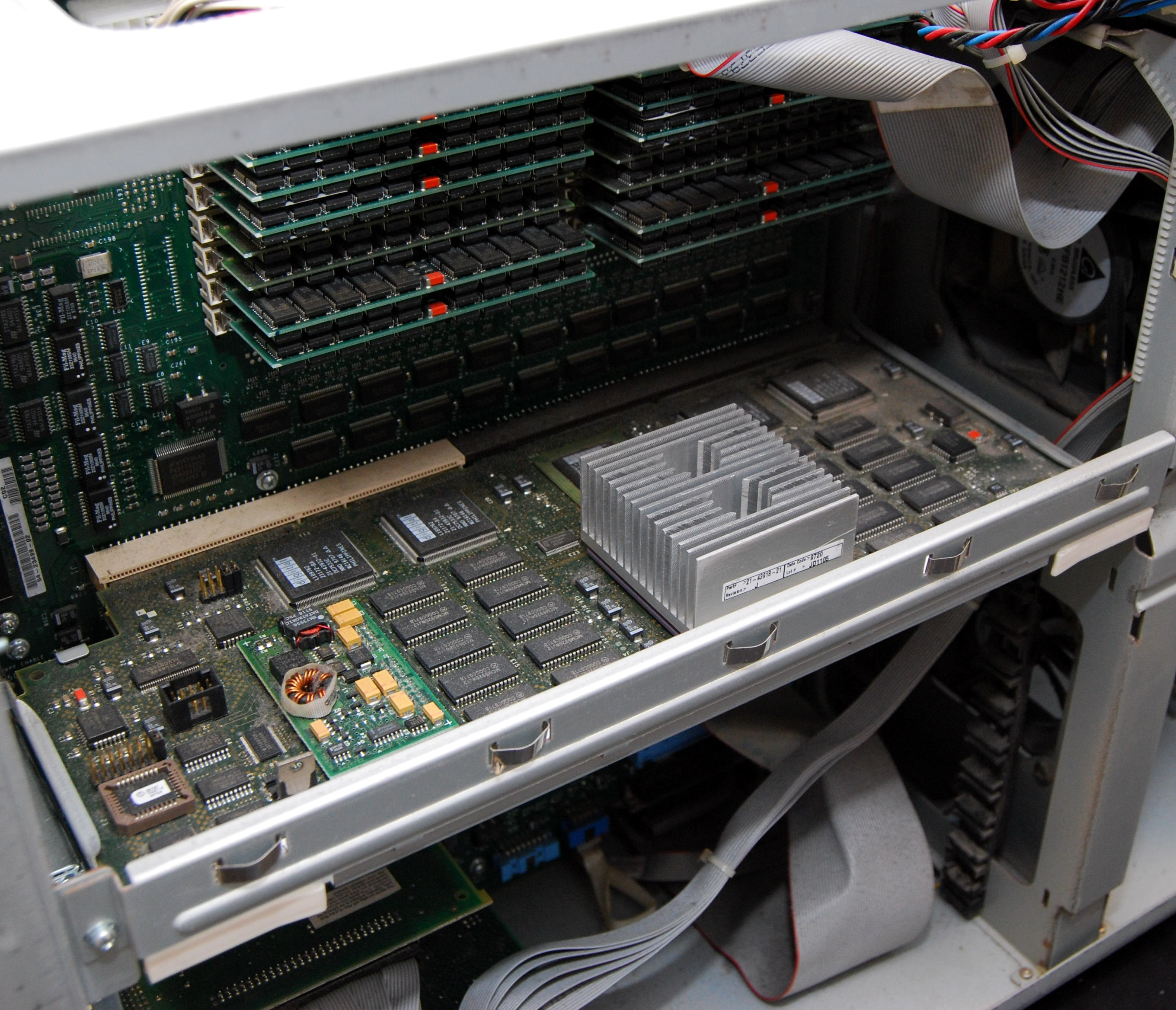
Inside a DEC AlphaServer 1000A

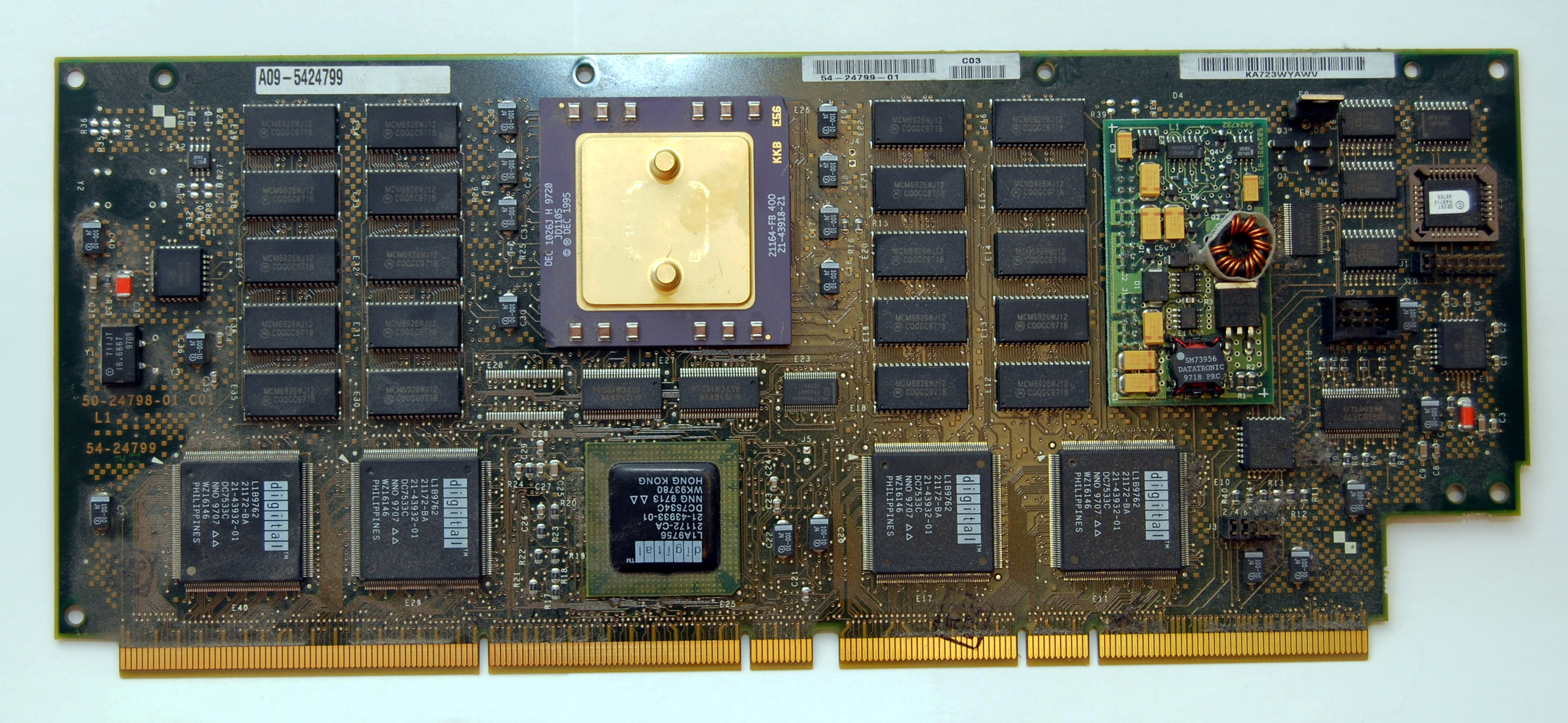
Alphaserver 1000A CPU board

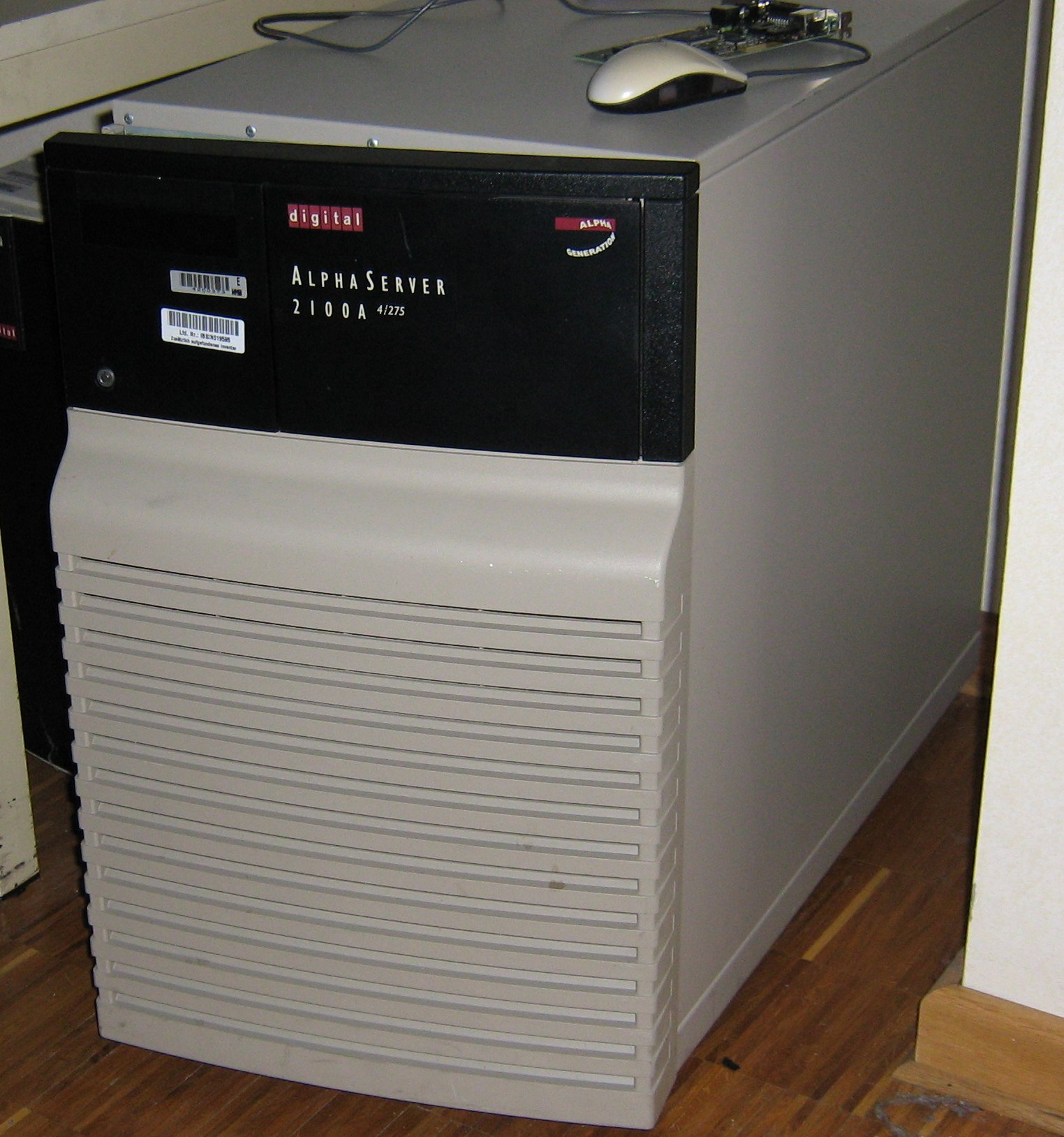
AlphaServer 2100A

In approximate chronological order, the following AlphaServer models were produced:

=== Avanti family ===
Model		Code name	# of CPUs	CPU	CPU MHz	B-cache	Chipset	Max. memory	Expansion	Enclosure	Introduced	Discontinued
200	4/100	Mustang	1	21064 (EV4)	100	512 KB	21071	8 to 384 MB	1 PCI; 1 or 2 PCI/ISA; 1 ISA	Desktop	?	?
200	4/166	Mustang	1	21064 (EV4)	166	512 KB	21071	8 to 384 MB	1 PCI; 1 or 2 PCI/ISA; 1 ISA	Desktop	?	?
200	4/233	Mustang	1	21064A (EV45)	233	512 KB	21071	8 to 384 MB	1 PCI; 1 or 2 PCI/ISA; 1 ISA	Desktop	?	?
400	4/166	Mustang S	1	21064 (EV4)	166	512 KB	21071	8 to 384 MB (6x 72-pin SIMMs, 3 banks)	2 PCI; 1 PCI/ISA; 3 ISA	Mini-tower	?	?
400	4/233	Mustang S	1	21064A (EV45)	233	512 KB	21071	8 to 384 MB (6x 72-pin SIMMs, 3 banks)	2 PCI; 1 PCI/ISA; 3 ISA	Mini-tower	?	?
300	4/266	Melmac	1	21064A (EV45)	266	2 MB	21072	512 MB (8x 72-pin SIMMs, 2 banks)	1 PCI; 1 PCI/ISA; 1 ISA	Desktop or Rack	?	?

=== Sable family ===
Model		Code name	# of CPUs	CPU	CPU MHz	B-cache	Chipset	Memory	Expansion	Enclosure	Introduced	Discontinued
2100	4/200	Sable	1, 2, 3 or 4	21064 (EV4)	200	1 MB / CPU	?	2 GB (1 GB if 4 CPU)	3 PCI, 8 EISA	Pedestal or rack	?	?
2100	4/233	Sable45	1, 2, 3 or 4	21064A (EV45)	233	1 MB / CPU	?	2 GB (1 GB if 4 CPU)	3 PCI, 8 EISA	Pedestal or rack	?	?
2100	4/275	Sable45	1, 2, 3 or 4	21064A (EV45)	275	4 MB / CPU	?	2 GB (1 GB if 4 CPU)	3 PCI, 8 EISA	Pedestal or rack	?	?
2100	5/250	Gamma-Sable	1, 2, 3 or 4	21164 (EV5)	250	4 MB / CPU	?	2 GB (1 GB if 4 CPU)	3 PCI, 8 EISA	Pedestal or rack	?	?
2100	5/300	Gamma-Sable	1, 2, 3 or 4	21164 (EV5)	291	4 MB / CPU	?	2 GB (1 GB if 4 CPU)	3 PCI, 8 EISA	Pedestal or rack	?	?
2100	5/375	Gamma-Sable	1, 2, 3 or 4	21164A (EV56)	375	4 MB / CPU	?	2 GB (1 GB if 4 CPU)	3 PCI, 8 EISA	Pedestal or rack	?	?
2000	4/200	Demi-Sable	1 or 2	21064; EV4	190	1 MB / CPU	?	640 MB	3 PCI, 7 EISA, 1 PCI/EISA	Pedestal	?	?
2000	4/233	Demi-Sable45	1 or 2	21064A (EV45)	233	1 MB / CPU	?	1 GB	3 PCI, 7 EISA	Pedestal	?	?
2000	4/275	Demi-Sable45	1 or 2	21064A (EV45)	275	4 MB / CPU	?	1 GB	3 PCI, 7 EISA	Pedestal	?	?
2000	5/250	Demi-Gamma	1 or 2	21164 (EV5)	250	4 MB / CPU	?	1 GB	3 PCI, 7 EISA	Pedestal	?	?
2000	5/300	Demi-Gamma	1 or 2	21164 (EV5)	291	4 MB / CPU	?	1 GB	3 PCI, 7 EISA	Pedestal	?	?
2000	5/375	Demi-Gamma	1 or 2	21164A (EV56)	375	4 or 8 MB / CPU	?	1 GB	3 PCI, 7 EISA	Pedestal	?	?

The AlphaServer 2100 was briefly sold as the Digital 2100 before the AlphaServer brand was introduced.

=== Mikasa family ===
Model		Code name	# of CPUs	CPU	CPU MHz	B-cache	Chipset	Memory	Expansion	Enclosure	Introduced	Discontinued
1000	4/200	Mikasa	1	21064 (EV4)	200	2 MB	21071^{2}	512 MB	2 PCI, 1 PCI/EISA, 7 EISA	Pedestal or Rack	?	?
1000	4/233	Mikasa+	1	21064A (EV45)	233	2 MB	21071^{2}	?	2 PCI, 1 PCI/EISA, 7 EISA	Pedestal or Rack	1995	?
1000	4/266	Mikasa+	1	21064A (EV45)	266	2 MB	21071^{2}	1 GB (20× 72-pin SIMMs, 4 banks)^{1}	2 PCI, 1 PCI/EISA, 7 EISA	Pedestal or Rack	?	?
1000	5/300	Mikasa-Pinnacle	1	21164 (EV5)	300	2 MB	?	1 GB (20× 72-pin SIMMs, 4 banks)^{1}	2 PCI, 1 PCI/EISA, 7 EISA	Pedestal or Rack	?	?
^1 Each bank contained five SIMMs. The initial four SIMMs were used for data; the fifth SIMM was used for ECC.^2 AlphaServer 1000 Service Guide EK-DTLSV-SV. B01, page 5-2

=== Noritake family ===
Model		Code name	# of CPUs	CPU	CPU MHz	B-cache	Chipset	Memory	Expansion	Enclosure	Introduced	Discontinued
1000A	4/233	Noritake	1	21064A (EV45)	233	2 MB	21071^{2}	1 GB (20x 72-pin SIMMs, 4 banks)^{1}	7 PCI; 2 ISA	Pedestal or Rack	?	?
1000A	4/266	Noritake	1	21064A (EV45)	266	2 MB	21071^{2}	1 GB (20x 72-pin SIMMs, 4 banks)^{1}	7 PCI; 2 ISA	Pedestal or Rack	?	?
1000A	5/300	Noritake-Pinnacle	1	21164 (EV5)	300	2 MB	?	1 GB (20x 72-pin SIMMs, 4 banks)^{1}	7 PCI; 2 ISA	Pedestal or Rack	?	?
1000A	5/333	Noritake-Pinnacle	1	21164 (EV5)	333	2 MB	21171^{2}	1 GB (20x 72-pin SIMMs, 4 banks)^{1}	7 PCI; 2 ISA	Pedestal or Rack	?	?
1000A	5/400	Noritake-Primo	1	21164A (EV56)	400	2 MB	21171^{2}	1 GB (20x 72-pin SIMMs, 4 banks)^{1}	7 PCI; 2 ISA	Pedestal or Rack	?	?
1000A	5/500	Noritake-Primo	1	21164A (EV56)	500	8 MB	?	1 GB (20x 72-pin SIMMs, 4 banks)^{1}	7 PCI; 2 ISA	Pedestal or Rack	1997-04-14	?
800	5/333	Corelle	1	21164A (EV56)	333	2 MB	21171^{3}	2 GB (8x ECC EDO DIMMs, 2 banks)^{3}	3 PCI; 2 EISA; 1 PCI-X/EISA^{3}	Mini-tower (can be converted to Rack)	1997-04-14	?
800	5/400	Corelle	1	21164A (EV56)	400	2 MB	21171^{3}	2 GB (8x ECC EDO DIMMs, 2 banks)^{3}	3 PCI; 2 EISA; 1 PCI-X/EISA^{3}	Mini-tower (can be converted to Rack)	1997-04-14	?
800	5/500	Corelle	1	21164A (EV56)	500	2 MB	21171^{3}	2 GB (8x ECC EDO DIMMs, 2 banks)^{3}	3 PCI; 2 EISA; 1 PCI-X/EISA^{3}	Mini-tower (can be converted to Rack)	1997-10-27	?
^15 modules per bank, 5th module used for ECC, later 1000A 5/500 systems have 16 slots, 4 modules with ECC per bank^2AlphaServer 1000A Technical Summary, page 6^3AlphaServer 800 Service Guide EK–ASV80–SG. A01

=== Rawhide family ===
Model		Code name	# of CPUs	CPU	CPU MHz	B-cache / CPU	Chipset	Memory	Expansion	Enclosure	Introduced	Discontinued
4000	5/300	Wrangler/Durango	Up to two	21164 (EV5)	300	2 MB	?	4 GB	8-16 PCI (including 3 shared PCI/EISA)	Pedestal/Rack	1996-09-04	?
4000	5/400	Wrangler/Durango	Up to two	21164A (EV56)	400	4 MB	?	4 GB	8-16 PCI (including 3 shared PCI/EISA)	Pedestal/Rack	1996-09-04	?
4000	5/466	Wrangler/Durango	Up to two	21164A (EV56)	466	4 MB	?	4 GB	8-16 PCI (including 3 shared PCI/EISA)	Pedestal/Rack	?	?
4000	5/533	Wrangler/Durango	Up to two	21164A (EV56)	533	4 MB	?	4 GB	8-16 PCI (including 3 shared PCI/EISA)	Pedestal/Rack	1997-10-27	?
4000	5/600	Wrangler/Durango	Up to two	21164A (EV56)	600	8 MB	?	4 GB	8-16 PCI (including 3 shared PCI/EISA)	Pedestal/Rack	?	?
4100	5/300E	Dodge	Up to four	21164 (EV5)	300	None	Custom	32 MB to 8 GB	5 PCI, 3 PCI/EISA	Pedestal/Rack	?	?
4100	5/300	Dodge	Up to four	21164 (EV5)	300	2 MB	Custom	32 MB to 8 GB	5 PCI, 3 PCI/EISA	Pedestal/Rack	?	?
4100	5/400	Dodge	Up to four	21164A (EV56)	400	4 MB	Custom	32 MB to 8 GB	5 PCI, 3 PCI/EISA	Pedestal/Rack	?	?
4100	5/466	Dodge	Up to four	21164A (EV56)	466	4 MB	Custom	32 MB to 8 GB	5 PCI, 3 PCI/EISA	Pedestal/Rack	?	?
4100	5/533	Dodge	Up to four	21164A (EV56)	533	4 MB	Custom	32 MB to 8 GB	5 PCI, 3 PCI/EISA	Pedestal/Rack	?	?
4100	5/600	Dodge	Up to four	21164A (EV56)	600	8 MB	Custom	32 MB to 8 GB	5 PCI, 3 PCI/EISA	Pedestal/Rack	?	?
1200	5/400	Tincup	Up to two	21164A (EV56)	400	4 MB / proc.	?	4 GB	4 PCI-X, 1 PCI, 1PCI-X/EISA	Pedestal	1997-10-27	?
1200	5/533	Tincup	Up to two	21164A (EV56)	533	4 MB / proc.	?	4 GB	4 PCI-X, 1 PCI, 1PCI-X/EISA	Pedestal	1997-10-27	?

=== Turbolaser family ===
Model		Code name	# of CPUs	CPU	CPU MHz	B-cache / CPU	Chipset	Memory	Expansion	Enclosure	Introduced	Discontinued
8200	5/300	TurboLaser	2 to 6	EV5	300	4 MB	Custom; ASICs	12 GB	132 PCI slots, 8 EISA slots	Rack	1995-04-11	?
8200	5/350	TurboLaser	2 to 6	EV5	350	4 MB	Custom; ASICs	12 GB	132 PCI slots, 8 EISA slots	Rack	?	?
8200	5/440	TurboLaser	2 to 6	EV56	437	4 MB	Custom; ASICs	12 GB	132 PCI slots, 8 EISA slots	Rack	?	?
8200	5/625	TurboLaser	2 to 6	EV56	612	4 MB	Custom; ASICs	12 GB	132 PCI slots, 8 EISA slots	Rack	?	?
8400	5/300	TurboLaser	Up to 12 (later 14)	EV5	300	4 MB	Custom; ASICs	28 GB	144 PCI, 8 EISA, XMI	Cabinet	1995-04-11	?
8400	5/350	TurboLaser	Up to 12 (later 14)	EV5	350	4 MB	Custom; ASICs	28 GB	144 PCI, 8 EISA, XMI	Cabinet	?	?
8400	5/440	TurboLaser	Up to 12 (later 14)	EV56	437	4 MB	Custom; ASICs	28 GB	144 PCI, 8 EISA, XMI	Cabinet	?	?
8400	5/625	TurboLaser	Up to 12 (later 14)	EV56	612	4 MB	Custom; ASICs	28 GB	144 PCI, 8 EISA, XMI	Cabinet	?	?
GS60	6/525	TL6	2 to 6	EV6	525	4 MB	?	12 GB	132 PCI, 8 EISA	Rack	1998-10-19	?
GS60	6/700	TL6	2 to 6	EV67	700	8 MB	?	12 GB	132 PCI, 8 EISA	Rack	1999-11-11	?
GS60E	6/525	TL6	2 to 6 (later 8)	EV6	525	4 MB	?	12 GB	132 PCI, 8 EISA	Rack	1999-07-19	?
GS60E	6/700	TL6	2 to 6 (later 8)	EV67	700	8 MB	?	12 GB	132 PCI, 8 EISA	Rack	1999-11-11	?
GS140	6/525	TL6	2 to 14	EV6	525	4 MB	?	28 GB	144 PCI, 8 EISA, 24 XMI	Cabinet	1998-10-19	?
GS140	6/700	TL6	2 to 14	EV67	700	8 MB	?	28 GB	144 PCI, 8 EISA, 24 XMI	Cabinet	1999-11-11	?

=== Lynx family ===
Model		Code name	# of CPUs	CPU	CPU MHz	B-cache	Chipset	Memory	Expansion	Enclosure	Introduced	Discontinued
2000A		Demi-Lynx (EV45), Demi-Gamma-Lynx (EV5)	Up to two	EV45, EV5 or EV56	233, 250, 275, 300, 375, 400	?	?	?	?	Pedestal	?	?
2100A	4/275	Lynx	Up to 4	21064A (EV45)	275	4 MB	?	2 GB, 1 GB for 4 CPU	8 PCI, 3 EISA	Pedestal	?	?
2100A	5/250	Gamma-Lynx	Up to 4	21164 (EV5)	250	4 MB	?	2 GB, 1 GB for 4 CPU	8 PCI, 3 EISA	Pedestal	?	?
2100A	5/300	Gamma-Lynx	Up to 4	21164 (EV5)	300	4 MB	?	2 GB, 1 GB for 4 CPU	8 PCI, 3 EISA	Pedestal	?	?
2100A	5/375	Gamma-Lynx	Up to 4	21164 (EV5)	375	8 MB	?	2 GB, 1 GB for 4 CPU	8 PCI, 3 EISA	Pedestal	?	?

=== Tsunami family ===
Model		Code name	# of CPUs	CPU	CPU MHz	B-cache	Chipset	Memory	Expansion	Enclosure	Introduced	Discontinued
DS10	6/466	WebBrick	1	EV6	466	2 MB	21272 (Tsunami)	2 GB	3 PCI-X, 1 PCI	desktop	1999-05-10	?
DS10	67/600	WebBrick	1	EV67	600	2 MB	21272 (Tsunami)	2 GB	3 PCI-X, 1 PCI	desktop	?	?
DS10L	6/466	Slate	1	EV6	466	2 MB	21272 (Tsunami)	1 GB	1 PCI-X	Rack (1U)	?	?
DS10L	6/600	Slate	1	EV67	600	2 MB	21272 (Tsunami)	1 GB	1 PCI-X	Rack (1U)	2000-04-10	?
DS20	6/500	Goldrush	Up to 2	21264 (EV6)	500	4 MB	?	4 GB	5PCI-X, 1 PCI-X/ISA	pedestal/Rack	1999-01-02	?
DS20E	6/500	Goldrack	Up to 2	EV6	500	4 MB	21272 (Tsunami)	4 GB	5PCI-X, 1 PCI-X/ISA	pedestal/Rack	?	?
DS20E	6/667	Goldrack	Up to 2	EV67	667	8 MB	21272 (Tsunami)	4 GB	5PCI-X, 1 PCI-X/ISA	pedestal/Rack	2000-04-10	?
DS20E	68/833	Goldrack	Up to 2	EV68AL	833	8 MB	?	4 GB	5PCI-X, 1 PCI-X/ISA	pedestal/Rack	2001-07-16	?
DS20L	68/833	Shark	2	EV68AL	833	4 MB	21271(Tsunami)	2 GB	2 PCI-X	Rack (1U)	2001-07-16	?
ES40	6/500	Clipper	Up to 4	EV6	500	4 MB	21272(Tsunami/Typhoon)	Model 1: 16 GB; Model 2: 32 GB	Model 1: 6 PCI-X; Model 2: 10 PCI-X	pedestal/Rack	1999-04-22	?
ES40	6/667	Clipper	Up to 4	EV67	667	8 MB	21272(Tsunami/Typhoon)	Model 1: 16 GB; Model 2: 32 GB	Model 1: 6 PCI-X; Model 2: 10 PCI-X	pedestal/Rack	2000-04-10	?
ES40	68/833	Clipper	Up to 4	EV68AL	833	8 MB	?	Model 1: 16 GB; Model 2: 32 GB	Model 1: 6 PCI-X; Model 2: 10 PCI-X	pedestal/Rack	2001-02-12	?

=== Titan family ===
Model		Code name	# of CPUs	CPU	CPU MHz	B-cache	Chipset	Memory	Expansion	Enclosure	Introduced	Discontinued
DS15	68/1000	HyperBrick	1	EV68CB	1000	2 MB	?	4 GB	4 PCI-X 33 MHz or 2 PCI-X 66 MHz	Tower	2003-10-20	2007-04-27
DS25	68/1000	Granite	Up to 2	EV68CB	1000	8 MB	?	16 GB	6 PCI-X	Tower/5U Rack	2002-08-04	?
ES45	68/1000	Privateer	Up to 4	EV68CB	1000	8 MB	?	1: Up to 16 GB; 2: Up to 32 GB	1: AGP 4x, 6 PCI-X; 2: 10 PCI-X	Pedestal/8U Rack, tower	?	?
ES45	68/1250	Privateer	Up to 4	EV68CB	1250	16 MB	?	1: Up to 16 GB; 2: Up to 32 GB	1: AGP 4x, 6 PCI-X; 2: 10 PCI-X	Pedestal/8U Rack, tower	2002-08-04	?

=== Wildfire family ===
Model	Code name	# of CPUs	CPU	CPU MHz	B-cache	Chipset	Memory	Expansion	Enclosure	Introduced	Discontinued
GS80	Wildfire	Model 4: 2 to 4 Model 8: 2 to 8	21264A (EV67)	731	4 MB	Custom	Up to 64 GB	33 MHz PCI-X: Up to 16 buses, 56 slots	Rack	2000-05-16	?
GS80	Wildfire	Model 4: 2 to 4 Model 8: 2 to 8	21264C (EV68CB)	1001	4, 8 MB	Custom	Up to 64 GB	33 MHz PCI-X: Up to 16 buses, 56 slots	Rack	?	?
GS80	Wildfire	Model 4: 2 to 4 Model 8: 2 to 8	21264C (EV68CB)	1224	4, 8, 16 MB	Custom	Up to 64 GB	33 MHz PCI-X: Up to 16 buses, 56 slots	Rack	2002-08-04	?
GS160	Wildfire	Model 8: 2 to 8 Model 16: 2 to 16	21264A (EV67)	731	4 MB	Custom	Up to 128 GB	33 MHz PCI-X: Up to 32 buses, 112 slots	Rack(s)	2000-05-16	?
GS160	Wildfire	Model 8: 2 to 8 Model 16: 2 to 16	21264C (EV68CB)	1001	4, 8 MB	Custom	Up to 128 GB	33 MHz PCI-X: Up to 32 buses, 112 slots	Rack(s)	?	?
GS160	Wildfire	Model 8: 2 to 8 Model 16: 2 to 16	21264C (EV68CB)	1224	4, 8, 16 MB	Custom	Up to 128 GB	33 MHz PCI-X: Up to 32 buses, 112 slots	Rack(s)	2002-08-04	?
GS320	Wildfire	Model 24: 2 to 24; Model 32: 2 to 32	21264A (EV67)	731	4 MB	Custom	Up to 256 GB	33 MHz PCI-X: Up to 64 buses, 224 slots	Rack(s)	2000-05-16	?
GS320	Wildfire	Model 24: 2 to 24; Model 32: 2 to 32	21264C (EV68CB)	1001	4, 8 MB	Custom	Up to 256 GB	33 MHz PCI-X: Up to 64 buses, 224 slots	Rack(s)	?	?
GS320	Wildfire	Model 24: 2 to 24; Model 32: 2 to 32	21264C (EV68CB)	1224	4, 8, 16 MB	Custom	Up to 256 GB	33 MHz PCI-X: Up to 64 buses, 224 slots	Rack(s)	2002-08-04	?

=== AlphaServer SC ===
Model	Code name	# of CPUs	CPU	CPU MHz	B-cache	Chipset	Max. Memory	Expansion	Enclosure	Introduced	Discontinued
SC20 68/833	?	8 to 256	21264B; EV68AL	833	2 MB	?	2 GB/node	2 PCI-X	Rack(s)	2002-05-02	?
SC40 67/667	Sierra	64 to 512	21264A; EV67	667	8 MB	?	24 GB/node	10 PCI-X	Rack(s)	1999-11-17	?
SC40 68/833	Sierra	64 to 512	21264B; EV68AL	833	8 MB	?	24 GB/node	10 PCI-X	Rack(s)	?	?
SC45 68/1250	Sierra	16 to 4096	21264C; EV68CB	1250	16 MB	?	32 GB/node	10 PCI-X	Rack(s)	?	?

The AlphaServer SC was a supercomputer constructed from a set of individual DS20L, ES40 or ES45 servers (called "nodes") mounted in racks. Every node was connected to every other node using a Quadrics elan3 interconnect and the systems were designed and used primarily for high-performance technical computing.

=== Marvel family ===
Model	Code name	# of CPUs	CPU	CPU MHz	Scache	Chipset	Memory	Expansion	Enclosure	CPU Drawers	Introduced	Discontinued
ES47	?	1 to 2	21364 (EV7)	1000; 1150	1.75 MB	?	Up to 16 GB	1 AGP; 5 PCI/PCI-X slots	Tower	n/a	2003-01-20	2007-04-27
ES47	?	1 to 4	21364 (EV7)	1000; 1150	1.75 MB	?	Up to 32 GB	Up to 4 AGP; Up to 32 PCI/PCI-X slots	Rack	1 to 2; 2-CPU drawers	2003-01-20	2007-04-27
ES80	?	4 to 8	21364 (EV7)	1000; 1150	1.75 MB	?	Up to 64 GB	Up to 8 AGP; Up to 64 PCI/PCI-X slots	Rack	1 to 4; 2-CPU drawers	2003-01-20	2007-04-27
GS1280	?	8 to 64	21364 (EV7)	1150	1.75 MB	?	Up to 512 GB	Up to 64 AGP; Up to 704 PCI/PCI-X slots	Rack(s)	1 to 8; 8-CPU drawers	2003-01-20	2007-04-27
GS1280	?	8 to 64	21364; EV7z	1300	?	?	Up to 512 GB	Up to 64 AGP; Up to 704 PCI/PCI-X slots	Rack(s)	1 to 8; 8-CPU drawers	2004-08-16	2007-04-27

The AlphaServer GS1280 originally supported a maximum of 16 microprocessors. In October 2003, the number of microprocessors supported was increased to 64 and the supported memory capacity was doubled to 8 GB per microprocessor.
