= Digital Personal Workstation =

Workstation computer family

The Digital Personal Workstation, code named "sports car", is a family of entry-level to mid-range workstation computers developed and manufactured by Digital Equipment Corporation (DEC). These workstations are based on the DEC Alpha and Intel Pentium Pro or Pentium II microprocessors. Members of this family can run the Digital UNIX, OpenVMS, and Windows NT operating systems. The i-Series, based on Pentium Pro, was introduced first, on September 23, 1996.

== i-Series ==
The Digital Personal Workstation i-Series is based on the Intel Pentium Pro or Pentium II microprocessor and runs Windows NT.

Models include the:

- 180i - 180 MHz Pentium Pro, introduced on September 23, 1996
- 200i - 200 MHz Pentium Pro, introduced on September 23, 1996
- 200i² - 200 MHz Pentium Pro, introduced on September 23, 1996
- 266i - 266 MHz Pentium II
- 300i - 300 MHz Pentium II
- 350i - 350 MHz Pentium II
- 400i - 400 MHz Pentium II
- 266i+ - 266 MHz Pentium II
- 300i+ - 300 MHz Pentium II
- 333i+ - 333 MHz Pentium II

These workstations support either one or two microprocessors and use standard Intel chipsets: Pentium Pro models use the Intel 440FX, Pentium II models suffixed with "i" use the Intel 440BX whereas ones suffixed with "i+" use the Intel 440LX. A superscript "2" suffix indicates a dual processor configuration.

The i-Series has four DIMM slots on its main logic board and supports standard unbuffered or registered 100 MHz ECC SDRAM DIMMs. Using unbuffered memory, the i-Series can support 32 to 512 MB of memory, with registered memory, 64 MB to 1 GB is supported. Unbuffered and registered DIMMs cannot be mixed in the same system. Unbuffered DIMMs have capacities of 32, 64 and 128 MB, whereas registered DIMMs have capacities of 64, 128 and 256 MB.

== a-Series ==
The Digital Personal Workstation a-Series, code named "Miata", uses the Alpha 21164A microprocessor. Models suffixed with "a" run Windows NT (with AlphaBIOS) as shipped, whereas models suffixed with "au" run Digital UNIX or OpenVMS (with SRM). Both models can be switched between AlphaBIOS and SRM via the system firmware. At COMDEX 1997, the Digital Personal Workstation 500a was a finalist in Byte magazine's Best of Show award for the best workstation category.

Models included the:

- 433a/433au - 433 MHz Alpha 21164A
- 500a/500au - 500 MHz Alpha 21164A
- 600a/600au - 600 MHz Alpha 21164A

The Alpha microprocessor is socketed in a zero insertion force (ZIF) socket and can be upgraded. These workstations use Digital's 21174 chipset, also known as the "Pyxis" chipset. To increase flexibility and to reduce cost, the L3 cache is optional in these models. If the L3 cache is required, a cache module that contained the SRAMs which implemented the cache can be installed into a cache slot. The cache module has two capacities: 2 or 4 MB.

Two revisions of the Miata motherboard were produced, known as MX5 and MiataGL respectively. The later MiataGL motherboard has a revised Pyxis chipset (which fixes a PCI DMA bug), a different ATA controller, an on-board QLogic 1040 SCSI host adapter, and a USB interface.

The a-Series has a 144-bit memory bus, with 128 bits used for data and 16 bits for ECC. There are three memory banks, each consisting of two DIMM slots, for a total of six DIMM slots, which supports 32 MB to 1.5 GB of memory. These machines accept standard unbuffered only PC100 ECC SDRAM DIMMs with a maximum capacity of 256 MB per DIMM, which must be installed in identical pairs in order to match the width of the memory bus.
