= PALcode =

Type of machine code

PALcode (Privileged Architecture Library code) is the name used by DEC in the Alpha instruction set architecture (ISA) for a set of functions in the System Reference Manual (SRM) or AlphaBIOS firmware, providing a hardware abstraction layer for system software, covering features such as cache management, translation lookaside buffer (TLB) miss handling, interrupt handling, and exception handling. It evolved from a feature of the DEC PRISM architecture named Epicode.

== Overview ==
PALcode is Alpha machine code, running in a special mode that also allows access to internal registers specific to the particular Alpha processor implementation. Thus, it is somewhere between the role of microcode and of a hardware emulator. PALcode is operating system-specific, so different versions of PALcode are required by OpenVMS, Tru64 UNIX, and Windows NT. Tru64 UNIX PALcode is also used by NetBSD, FreeBSD, OpenBSD and Linux.
