= AlphaStation =

Computer workstations

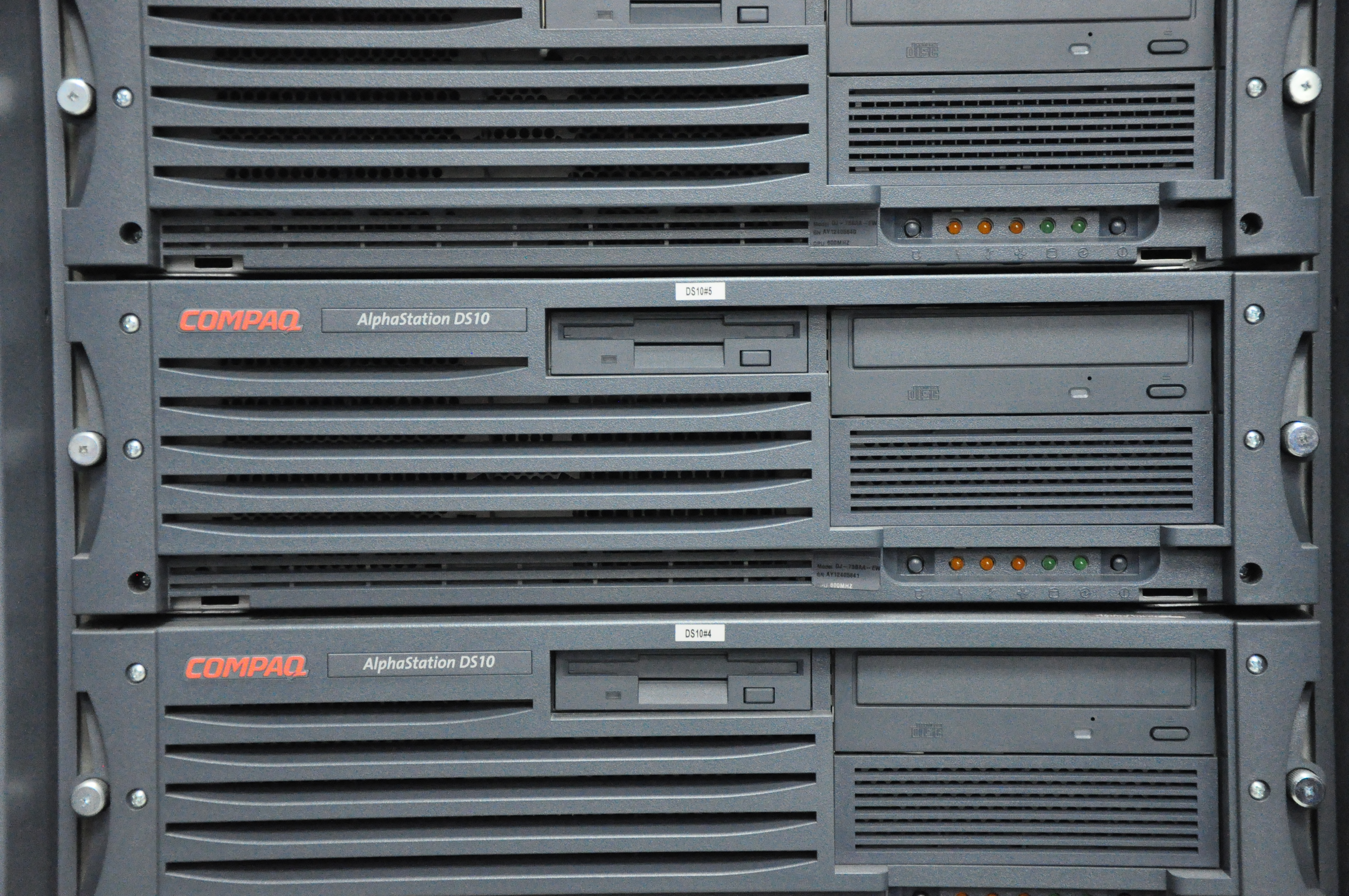
- Rack-mounted AlphaStation
- Developer: DEC (1994-1998); Compaq (1998-2002); HP (2002-2007)
- Type: Workstation
- Released: 1994
- Discontinued: 2007
- CPU: DEC Alpha

AlphaStation is the name given to a series of computer workstations, produced from 1994 onwards by Digital Equipment Corporation, and later by Compaq and HP. As the name suggests, the AlphaStations were based on the DEC Alpha 64-bit microprocessor. Supported operating systems for AlphaStations comprise Tru64 UNIX (formerly Digital UNIX), OpenVMS and Windows NT (with AlphaBIOS ARC firmware). Most of these workstations can also run various versions of Linux and BSD operating systems.

Other Alpha workstations produced by DEC include the DEC 2000 AXP (DECpc AXP 150), the DEC 3000 AXP, the Digital Personal Workstation a-series and au-series (codename Miata), the Multia VX40/41/42 and the Alpha XL/Alpha XLT line (a member of the Alcor family, which had swappable daughterboard with Pentium processor, to transform to a DEC Celebris XL line).

== Models ==
From the XP900 onwards, all AlphaStation models were simply workstation configurations of the corresponding AlphaServer model.

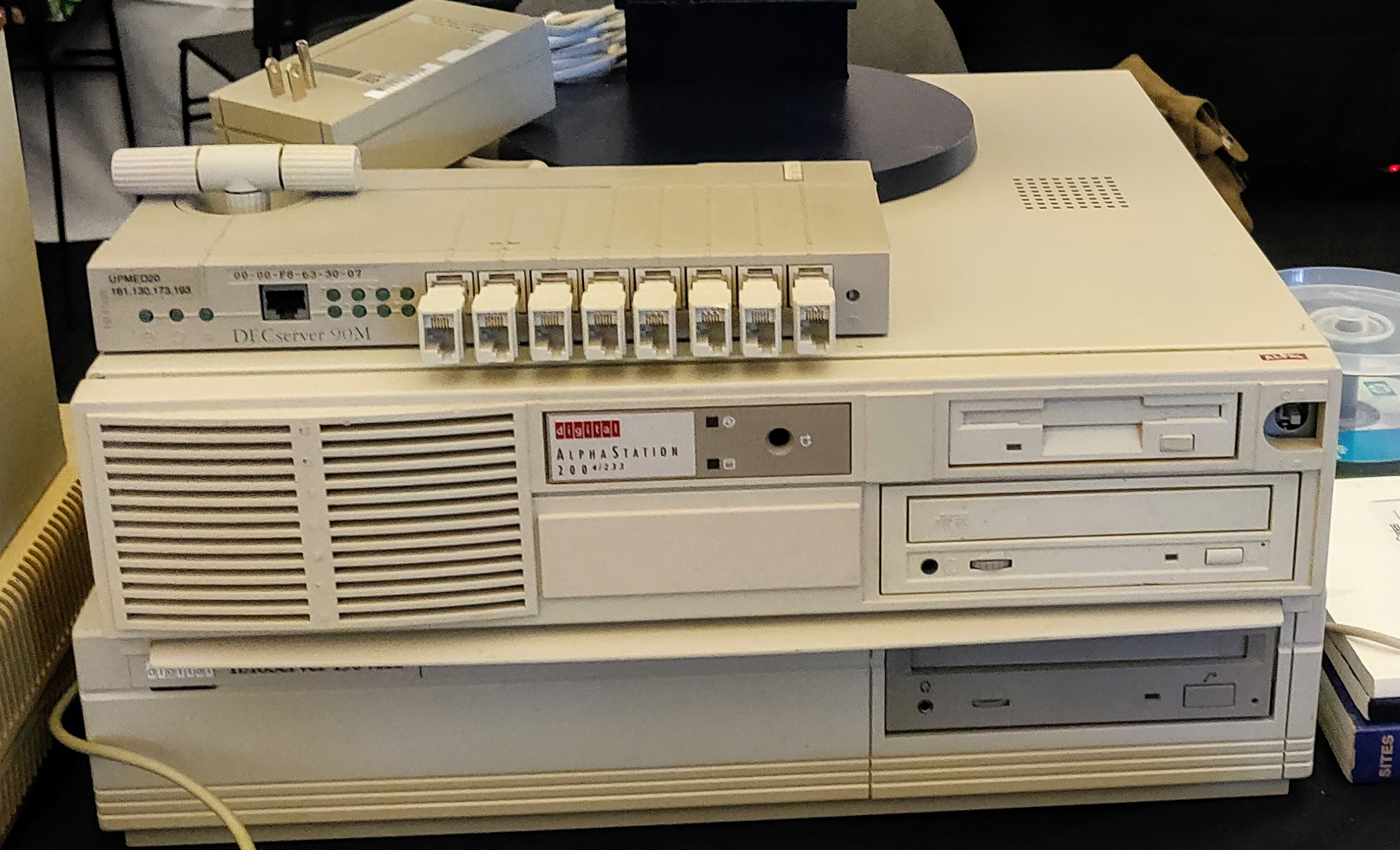
Digital AlphaStation 200 4/233

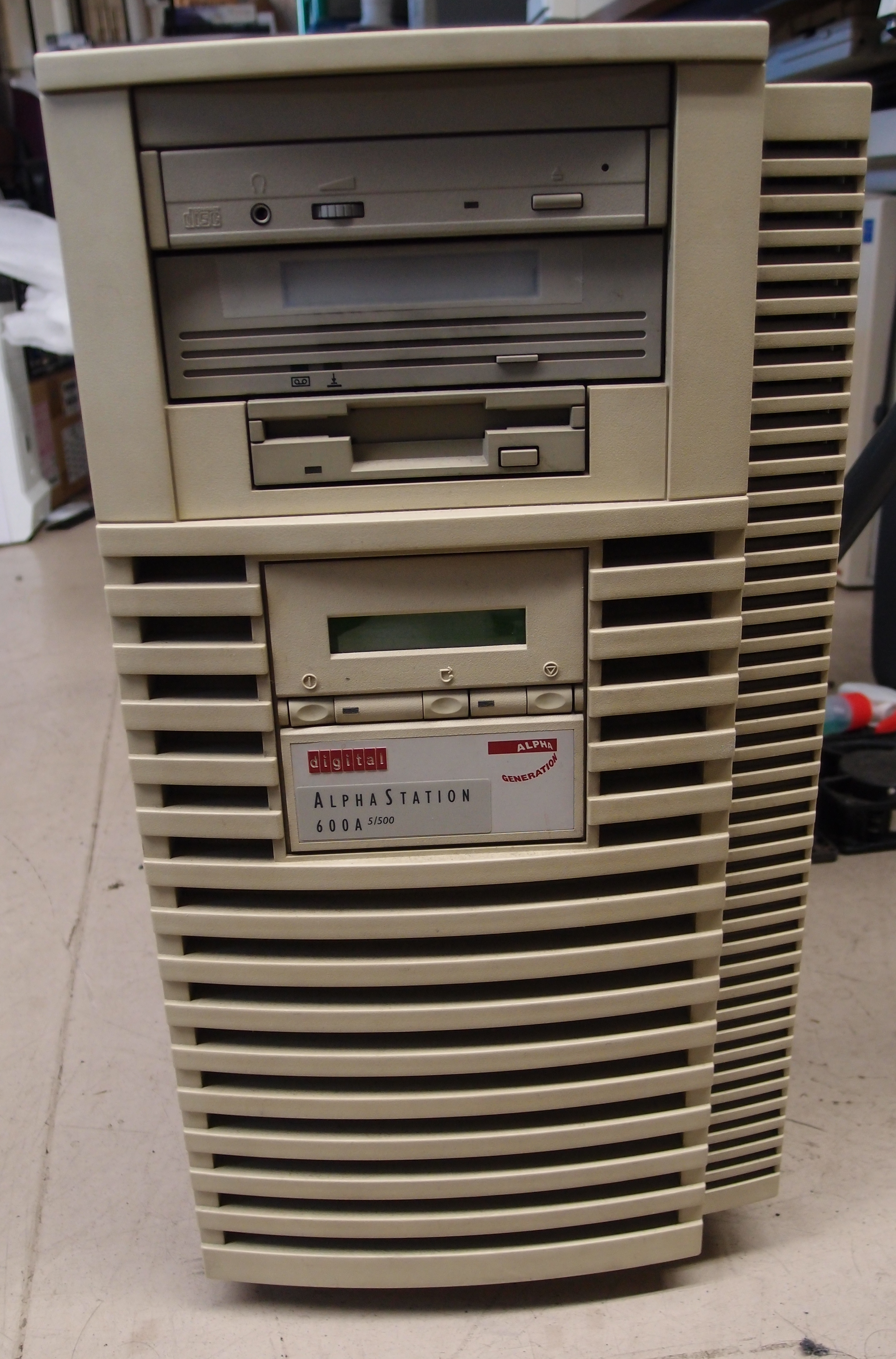
DEC AlphaStation 600A

=== Avanti family ===
Model	Code name	# of CPUs	CPU	CPU MHz	B-cache	Chipset	Memory	Expansion	Enclosure	Introduced	Discontinued
200 4/100	Mustang	1	21064 (EV4)	100	512 KB	21071	8 to 384 MB	1 PCI; 1 or 2 PCI/ISA; 1 ISA	Desktop	1995-02-23	?
200 4/166	Mustang	1	21064 (EV4)	166	512 KB	21071	8 to 384 MB	1 PCI; 1 or 2 PCI/ISA; 1 ISA	Desktop	1994-11-03	?
200 4/233	Mustang+	1	21064A (EV45)	233	512 KB	21071	8 to 384 MB	1 PCI; 1 or 2 PCI/ISA; 1 ISA	Desktop	1994-11-03	?
205 4/xxx	LX3	1	21064A (EV45)	133 to 333	?	?	?	?	Desktop	?	?
250 4/266	M3	1	21064A (EV45)	266	2 MB	21072	32 to 512 MB	1 PCI; 1 PCI/ISA; 1 ISA	Desktop	1995-04-03	?
255/233	LX3+	1	21064A (EV45)	233	1 MB	21072	32 to 512 MB	2 PCI; 1 PCI/ISA; 1 ISA	Desktop	1996-03-06	?
255/300	LX3+	1	21064A (EV45)	300	1 MB	21072	32 to 512 MB	2 PCI; 1 PCI/ISA; 1 ISA	Desktop	1996-03-06	?
400 4/166	Chinet	1	21064 (EV4)	166	512 KB	21071	8 to 384 MB	2 PCI; 1 PCI/ISA; 3 ISA	Tower	1995-02-23	?
400 4/233	Avanti	1	21064A (EV45)	233	512 KB	21071	8 to 384 MB	2 PCI; 1 PCI/ISA; 3 ISA	Tower	1994-11-03	?
400 4/266	Avanti	1	21064A (EV45)	266	512 KB	21071	8 to 384 MB	2 PCI; 1 PCI/ISA; 3 ISA	Tower	?	?
400 4/300	Avanti	1	21064A (EV45)	300	512 KB	21071	8 to 384 MB	2 PCI; 1 PCI/ISA; 3 ISA	Tower	?	?

=== Alcor Family ===
Model	Code name	# of CPUs	CPU	CPU MHz	B-cache	Chipset	Memory	Expansion	Enclosure	Introduced	Discontinued
500/266	Maverick	1	21164 (EV5)	266	2 MB	21171	32 to 512 MB	1 33 MHz PCI-X; 3 PCI	Desktop	1996-03-06	?
500/333	Maverick	1	21164 (EV5)	333	2 MB	21171	32 to 512 MB	1 33 MHz PCI-X; 3 PCI	Desktop	1996-03-06	?
500/400	Bret	1	21164A (EV56)	400	2 MB	21172	32 MB to 1 GB	1 33 MHz PCI-X; 3 PCI	Desktop	1996-03-06	?
500/500	Bret	1	21164A (EV56)	500	8 MB	21172	32 MB to 1 GB	1 33 MHz PCI-X; 3 PCI	Desktop	1996-08-06	?
600 5/266	Alcor	1	21164 (EV5)	266	2 or 4 MB	21171	32 MB to 1 GB	3 33 MHz PCI-X; 1 PCI; 1 PCI/EISA; 3 EISA	Pedestal	1995-08-02	?
600 5/300	Alcor	1	21164 (EV5)	300	2 or 4 MB	21171	32 MB to 1 GB	3 33 MHz PCI-X; 1 PCI; 1 PCI/EISA; 3 EISA	Pedestal	1995-08-02	?
600 5/333	Alcor	1	21164 (EV5)	333	4 MB	21171	32 MB to 1 GB	3 33 MHz PCI-X; 1 PCI; 1 PCI/EISA; 3 EISA	Pedestal	?	?

=== Noritake and Rawhide Family ===
Model	Code name	# of CPUs	CPU	CPU MHz	B-cache	Chipset	Memory	Expansion	Enclosure	Introduced	Discontinued
Noritake Family
600A 5/500	Alcor-Primo	1	21164A (EV56)	500	8 MB	?	32 MB to 1 GB	7 PCI; 2 EISA	Pedestal	?	?
Rawhide Family
1200^{1}	DaVinci	Up to 2	21164A (EV56)	400	4 MB	?	512 MB to 4 GB	5 PCI; 1 PCI/ISA	Pedestal	?	?
1200^{1}	DaVinci	Up to 2	21164A (EV56)	533	4 MB	?	512 MB to 4 GB	5 PCI; 1 PCI/ISA	Pedestal	?	?

=== Tsunami Family ===
Model	Code name	# of CPUs	CPU	CPU MHz	B-cache	Chipset	Memory	Expansion	Enclosure	Introduced	Discontinued
DS10; VS10; TS10; XP900	WebBrick	1	21264 (EV6)	466	2 MB	21272	256 MB to 2 GB; 100 MHz SDRAM	3 PCI-X; 1 PCI	Desktop	?	?
DS10; VS10; TS10; XP900	WebBrick	1	21264A (EV67)	600	2 MB	21272	256 MB to 2 GB; 100 MHz SDRAM	3 PCI-X; 1 PCI	Desktop	?	?
DS20E	Goldrack	1, 2	21264A (EV67)	667	8 MB (DDR)	21272	512 MB to 4 GB	5 PCI-X; 1 PCI-X/ISA	Tower	?	?
DS20E	Goldrack	1, 2	21264B (EV68AL)	833	8 MB (DDR)	21272	512 MB to 4 GB	5 PCI-X; 1 PCI-X/ISA	Tower	?	?
ES40	Clipper	1, 2, 3, 4	21264A (EV67)	667	8 MB (DDR)	21272	512 MB to 32 GB; 100 MHz SDRAM	6 or 10 PCI-X	Pedestal	?	?
ES40	Clipper	1, 2, 3, 4	21264B (EV68AL)	833	8 MB (DDR)	21272	512 MB to 32 GB; 100 MHz SDRAM	6 or 10 PCI-X	Pedestal	?	?
XP1000	Monet	1	21264 (EV6)	500	4 MB	21272	256 MB to 2 GB	2 PCI-X; 2 PCI; 1 PCI/ISA	Tower	1999-02-01	?
XP1000	Brisbane	1	21264A (EV67)	667	4 MB	21272	256 MB to 2 GB	2 PCI-X; 2 PCI; 1 PCI/ISA	Tower	?	?

=== Titan and Marvel Family ===
Model	Code name	# of CPUs	CPU	CPU MHz	B-cache	Chipset	Memory	Expansion	Enclosure	Introduced	Discontinued
Titan Family
DS15A	HyperBrick II	1	21264C (EV68CB)	1000	2 MB	?	512 MB to 4 GB; 133 MHz SDRAM	4 33 MHz PCI-X; 2 66 MHz PCI-X	Desktop	?	?
DS25	Granite	1, 2	21264C (EV68CB)	1000	8 MB (DDR)	?	512 MB to 16 GB	4 66 MHz PCI-X; 2 33 MHz PCI-X	Tower	?	?
Marvel Family
ES47	Marvel 2P	2^{2}	21364 (EV7)	1000	1.75 MB	On-die	512 MB to 16 GB; RDRAM	1 2× AGP; 1 133 MHz PCI-X; 4 66 MHz PCI-X	Tower	?	?

^1 A variant of the AlphaStation 1200 was also sold as the Digital Ultimate Workstation 533au².
^2 Some systems had one of the microprocessors deactivated, which may be reactivated with a license upgrade.

== See also ==
- AlphaVM: A full DEC Alpha system emulator running on Windows or Linux.
