= VAX 7000 and VAX 10000 =

Multiprocessor minicomputers

The VAX 7000 and VAX 10000 are a discontinued family of high-end multiprocessor minicomputers developed and manufactured by Digital Equipment Corporation (DEC), introduced in July 1992. These systems use NVAX microprocessors implementing the VAX instruction set architecture, and run the OpenVMS operating system.

They were designed in parallel with the DEC 7000 AXP and DEC 10000 AXP server computers, and were identical except for the CPU modules used and the supported I/O bus interfaces. Digital intended customers of the VAX 7000/10000 to eventually upgrade to the Alpha-based configuration, the AXPs, by simply swapping the VAX-based CPU module(s) for those based on the Alpha.

== Models ==
=== VAX 7000 ===
There were three models of the VAX 7000.

Model 6x0

The Model 6x0, code-named "Laser/Neon", was announced on 7 July 1992 in Zurich, Switzerland with the United States announcement on 15 July. It supported one to four 90.91 MHz (11 ns cycle time) NVAX+ microprocessors, with the value of "x" being 1 to 4.

Model 7x0

The Model 7x0, code-named "Laser/Krypton", was introduced in August 1994. It supported one to six 137.5 MHz NV5 (also known as NVAX++) microprocessors, with the value of "x" being 1 to 6.

Model 8x0

The Model 8x0, code-named "Laser/Krypton+", supported one to six 170.9 MHz NV5 microprocessors, with the value of "x" being 1 to 6.

=== VAX 10000 ===
The VAX 10000 was essentially a larger configuration of the VAX 7000. Both shared the same System Cabinet, but the VAX 10000 was configured as standard with one Expander Cabinet housing storage devices, and one Battery Cabinet housing an uninterruptible power supply. These were optional for a VAX 7000 system.

There was one model of the VAX 10000, the Model 6x0. Code-named "Blazer/Neon", it supported one to four 90.91 MHz (11 ns) NVAX+ microprocessors, with the value of "x" being 1 to 4.

== CPU module ==
The initial Model 600 used the KA7AA CPU module, which contained a 90.91 MHz (11 ns cycle time) NVAX+ microprocessor with 4 MB of B-cache (L2 cache). Later, the clock frequency of microprocessor featured was increased. The Model 700 used the KA7AB CPU module containing a 133.33 MHz (7.5 ns cycle time) NVAX++, and the Model 800 used the KA7AC CPU module featuring a 170.9 MHz NVAX++.

The CPU modules had two LEVI gate arrays which interfaced the microprocessor to the Laser System Bus, the system bus.

== Memory ==
The VAX 7000/10000 supported a maximum of 3.5 GB of memory. This was a limitation of the VAX architecture, which had 32-bit addressing which was common to all VAX hardware.
