= DEC Multia =

Desktop computers

Multia
- Manufacturer: Digital Equipment Corporation
- CPU: Alpha 21066; Alpha 21066A; Pentium
- Platform: Windows NT
- Website: digital.com/info/multia at the Wayback Machine (archived 1996-12-26)

The Multia, later re-branded the Universal Desktop Box, was a line of desktop computers introduced by Digital Equipment Corporation on 7 November 1994. The line is notable in that units were offered with either an Alpha AXP or Intel Pentium processor as the CPU, and most hardware other than the backplane and CPU were interchangeable. Both the Alpha and Intel versions were intended to run Windows NT.

The Multia had a compact case that left little room for expansion cards and restricted air flow, which can cause premature hardware failure due to overheating if not properly cared for. Enthusiasts remedy this by placing the Multia vertically instead of horizontally, allowing the heated air to escape via vents at the top, although this still requires preventing the Multia from overheating due to other factors, e.g. environmental.

== Hardware specifications ==
The Alpha Multias included either an Alpha 21066 or Alpha 21066A microprocessor running at 166 MHz or 233 MHz respectively, and came with 16 or 24 MB of RAM as standard (expandable to 128 MB officially, but in practice 256 MB). Because the 21066 was a budget version of the Alpha 21064 processor, it had a narrower (64-bit versus 128-bit) and slower bus and thus performance was roughly equivalent to a Pentium running at 100 MHz for integer operations, but superior in floating-point; furthermore, the standard RAM capacity was a severe restriction on the performance of these workstations. The Alpha-based Multias came with the TGA (DEC 21030) graphics adapter.

Standard peripherals on both Alpha and Intel models included a SCSI host adapter, DEC 21040 Ethernet controller, two PCMCIA slots, two RS-232 ports, a bi-directional parallel port, a 2.5 in or 3.5 in SCSI or ATA hard disk (340 MB to 1.6 GB), PS/2 keyboard and mouse ports, and a PCI slot (on models with 2.5-inch hard disks).

== Models ==
Multia models comprised:

- Alpha Multia (codenamed QuickSilver):
  - VX40: 166 MHz 21066, optional floppy disk drive and external SCSI
  - VX41: 166 MHz 21066 upgradable to 233 MHz 21066A
  - VX42: 233 MHz 21066A
- Intel Multia (codenamed Minerva):
  - VX51: 100 MHz Pentium (P54)

In 1996, Digital began offering the Alpha Multia without Windows NT and renamed the line the "Universal Desktop Box" (nicknamed "UDB"). Prices were quite low, such that for the first time many enthusiasts and hobbyists could afford an Alpha AXP-based computer. The Multia or UDB can run Windows NT for Alpha through Windows NT 4.0 Service Pack 6 (although Windows 2000 was never officially released for the Alpha platform, Windows 2000 Beta was released and in fact runs on the Multia), and both Linux and NetBSD are available for the Multia. Additionally, both Digital UNIX and OpenVMS can be configured to run on the Multia (with certain limitations), although initially such operating systems were disabled from running on the budget Multia line.

The Alpha-based Multia came configured with the ARC firmware console for running Windows NT, although SRM was also available. The Intel-based Multia used BIOS.

== See also ==
- DEC Alpha
- Digital Equipment Corporation
